= Plant 504 =

Chinese uranium enrichment plant

Coordinates: 36.15°N 103.52°E

A view of Plant 504 from the Ming-era Zhamatai watchtower

Plant 504 (Chinese: 五〇四厂), officially known today as CNNC Lanzhou Uranium Enrichment Co., Ltd. (中国核工业集团兰州铀浓缩有限公司), is a uranium enrichment facility in Lanzhou, Gansu, China. Established in the late 1950s as China's first uranium enrichment plant, it was one of the key facilities of the country's early nuclear industry. Nuclear fuel produced at Plant 504 was used in several major Chinese nuclear programmes, including China's first atomic bomb, first hydrogen bomb, first nuclear-powered submarine, and the Qinshan Nuclear Power Plant, the first nuclear power station built in mainland China.

Plant 504 subsequently developed into one of China's major uranium-enrichment production bases, producing nuclear fuel for both military and civilian purposes. In 2018, CNNC Lanzhou Uranium Enrichment was designated as a site of "Industrial Cultural Heritage of Central State-owned Enterprises (Nuclear Industry)" and was listed by the Ministry of Industry and Information Technology in the third batch of China's National Industrial Heritage sites in the following year.

== History ==
=== Planning ===
In the early years of the People's Republic of China, the growing nuclear threats amid the Cold War prompted the Chinese policymakers to develop its own independent nuclear industry, and the programme officially came into force in 1955. The Chinese Second Ministry of Machine Building subsequently began planning uranium mines, hydrometallurgical facilities, nuclear fuel-component plants, and uranium-enrichment facilities.

The Yellow River iron bridge dedicated to the Plant 504, built in December 1958

The site-selection committee for Plant 504 examined eleven candidate locations in Henan, Shanxi, Gansu, and Qinghai provinces. On 31 May 1958, General Secretary of the Chinese Communist Party (CCP) Deng Xiaoping approved the Second Ministry of Machine Building's siting plan for the "five plants and three mines" (五厂三矿), under which China's first uranium-enrichment plant, coded "Plant 504", was to be built in a highly discreet location in Xigu district of Lanzhou, Gansu. On 21 June of the same year, Chinese leader Mao Zedong called at an enlarged meeting of the CCP Central Military Commission for the development of advanced defence technologies including atomic bombs, hydrogen bombs, and intercontinental ballistic missiles. Plant 504 subsequently became one of the key uranium-enrichment projects in China's early nuclear industrial system.

=== Independent development ===
Deng Jiaxian, Wang Chengshu, Yang Zhenning, and Zhang Wenyu at the Chinese Academy of Sciences in 1972

Following the Sino-Soviet split, construction of Plant 504 and its technical development encountered serious difficulties with the withdrawal of almost all Soviet engineers and specialists. Qian Sanqiang, then vice minister of the Second Ministry of Machine Building, subsequently filled the void which the Soviets had left behind by mobilizing scientific personnel within China to participate in uranium-enrichment research, and invited female physicist Wang Chengshu, who had recently returned from the United States, to join the programme.

=== Commissioning ===
On 14 January 1964, Plant 504 produced its first batch of qualified highly enriched uranium. On 1 May of the same year, the core component of China's first atomic bomb was completed at Plant 404 in Gansu.

On 16 October 1964, China's first atomic bomb, using nuclear material produced at Plant 504, was successfully detonated at Lop Nur, Xinjiang.

In November 1968, construction began on Changzheng 1, China's first nuclear-powered submarine, using nuclear fuel produced at Plant 504. The submarine was launched on 16 December 1970 and formally commissioned into the People's Liberation Army Navy's North Sea Fleet on 1 August 1974.

=== Reform era ===
An advertisement for 504 ice cream displayed at a bus stop in Xigu District, Lanzhou

The easing of international tensions in the late 1970s reduced the perceived likelihood of full-scale nuclear warfare, leaving China with space to initiate economic reform that shifted the nation's strategic priorities from wartime preparation toward economic growth. Many defence-related enterprises, including Plant 504, responded to declining military demand and state funding by diversifying into civilian production. Some of the best-known products to emerge from this period were the "504" ice cream and soda, which became popular in Lanzhou and, for a time, was sold in various parts of China.

Boxes of "504"-branded soda at a malatang restaurant near Changfeng Machinery Factory in Lanzhou

Production of the original 504 ice cream ceased in the mid-to-late 1990s. During the 2010s, the "504" name returned to the Lanzhou market as a revived nostalgic brand, although the products were manufactured and marketed by newer food companies rather than representing a continuation of production by the original Plant 504.

Workers' Club of the Plant 504 residential complex

The flags of China and CNNC in front of the Plant 504 residential complex

=== Contemporary period ===
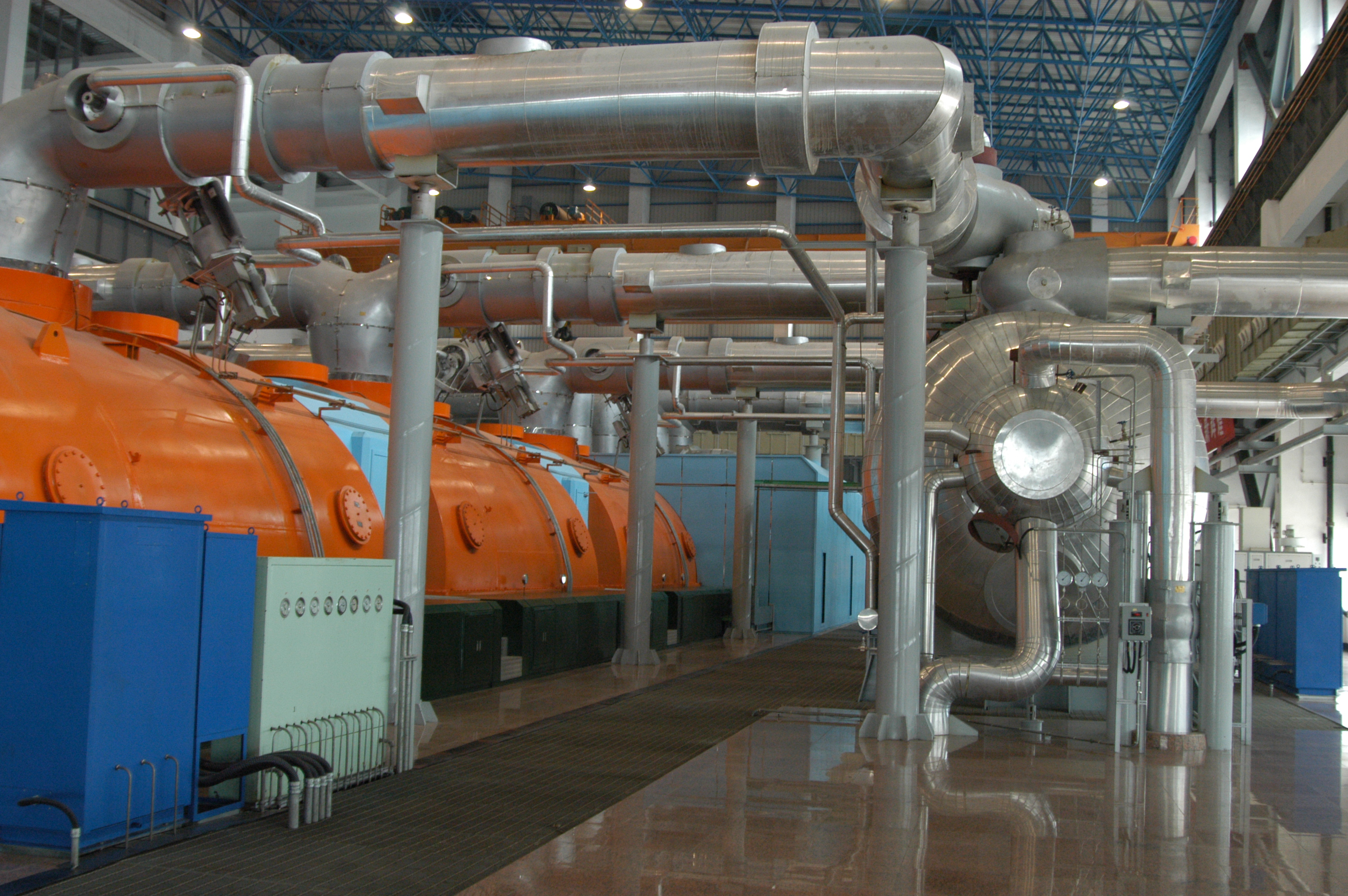
Turbine hall of Qinshan Nuclear Power Plant Phase 2

While continuing to undertake uranium-enrichment and nuclear-fuel production, Plant 504 also drew on its existing defence-related research, production, and management capabilities to support the supply of nuclear fuel for civilian nuclear power. It successively supplied initial fuel loads and subsequent reloads for the first and second phase of the Qinshan Nuclear Power Plant, Daya Bay Nuclear Power Plant, as well as Ling Ao Nuclear Power Plant. In 2009, the China Atomic Energy Authority officially described CNNC Lanzhou Uranium Enrichment as a large modern nuclear-fuel production enterprise supplying enriched uranium to nuclear power stations across China.
