= Monkwearmouth Railway Bridge =

Railway bridge over the River Wear

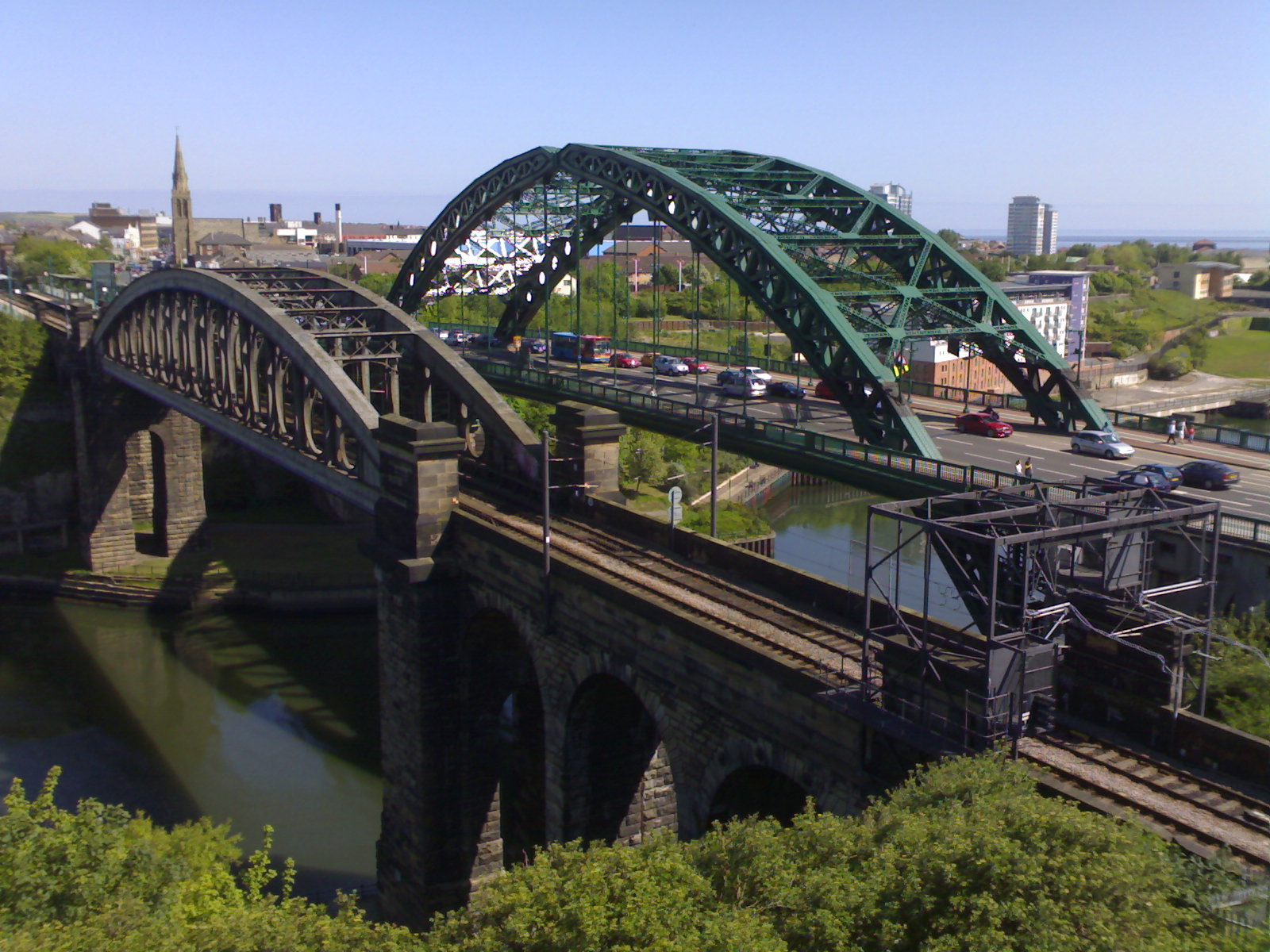
- Monkwearmouth Bridge (left), Wearmouth Bridge (right), 2006
- Coordinates: 54.9093°N 1.3831°W
- OS grid reference: NZ396573
- Carries: Durham Coast Line; Tyne and Wear Metro
- Crosses: River Wear
- Locale: Wearside
- Official name: Monkwearmouth Bridge
- Other names: Wearmouth Railway Bridge; Sunderland Railway Bridge
- Owner: Network Rail
- Maintained by: Network Rail
- Heritage status: Grade II listed
- Network Rail Bridge ID: LEN3-260
- Preceded by: Queen Alexandra Bridge
- Followed by: Wearmouth Bridge

Characteristics
- Design: Vierendeel truss bowstring arch
- Material: Wrought iron
- Longest span: 300 ft (91 m)
- Clearance below: 86 ft (26 m)

Rail characteristics
- No. of tracks: 2
- Track gauge: 4 ft 8 1/2 in (1,435 mm)
- Electrified: 1500V DC

History
- Designer: Thomas Elliot Harrison
- Constructed by: Hawks, Crawshay and Sons
- Fabrication by: John Waddell & Sons
- Opened: 1879

Statistics

Listed Building – Grade II
- Official name: Monkwearmouth Railway Bridge Over River Wear With Viaduct to North
- Designated: 10 November 1978
- Reference no.: 1207051

Location
- Interactive map of Monkwearmouth Railway Bridge

Monkwearmouth Railway Bridge (officially Monkwearmouth Bridge, also called Wearmouth Railway Bridge or Sunderland Railway Bridge) is a railway bridge built in 1879, crossing the River Wear at Sunderland and Monkwearmouth. The bridge lies adjacent to and upstream of the Wearmouth Road Bridge.

Originally built as part of the Monkwearmouth Junction Line, it provided the first direct railway link between Newcastle and Sunderland. The bridge is now used by Tyne and Wear Metro and Durham Coast Line services.

== History and design ==
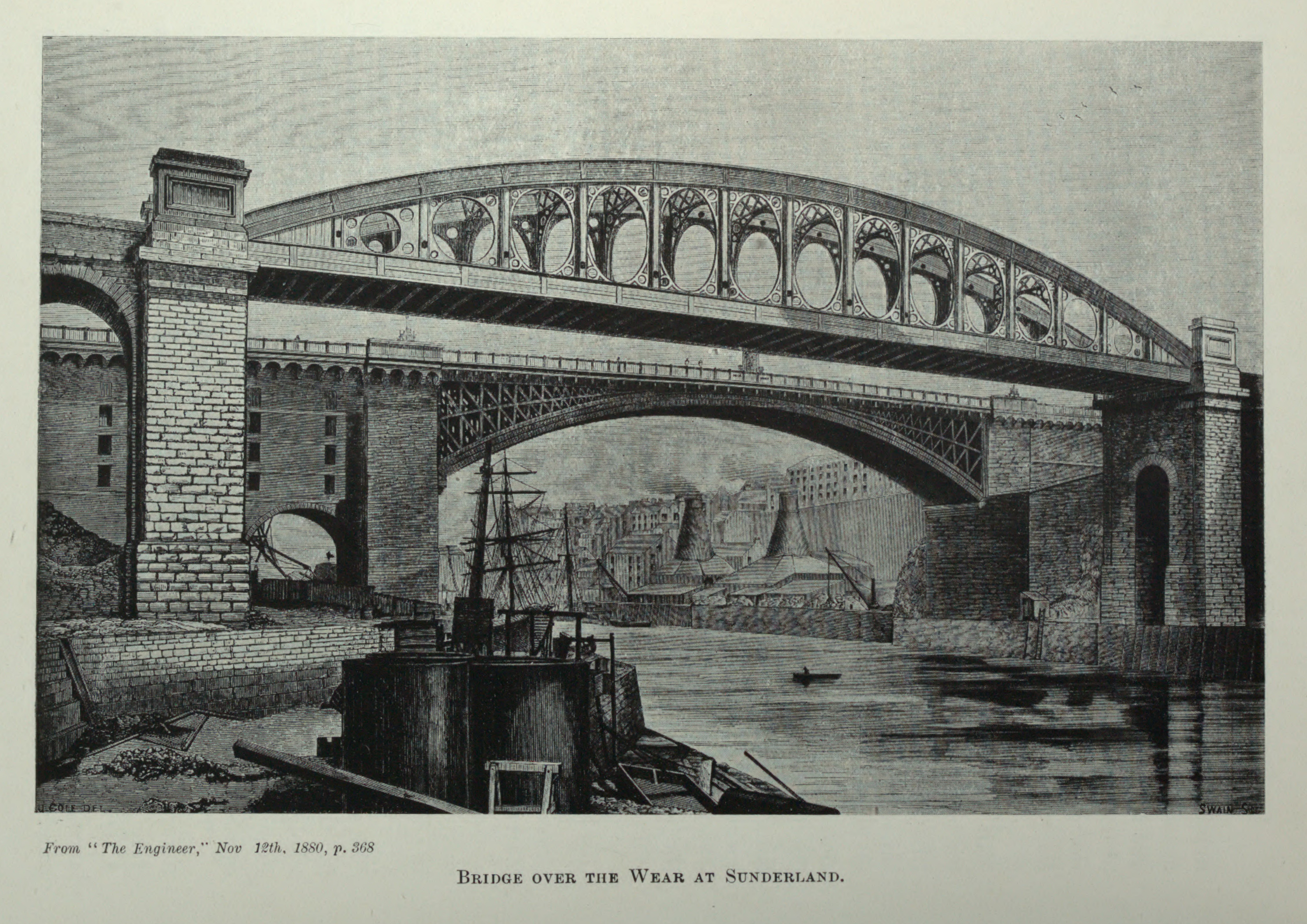
The bridge as built (from The Engineer, 1880). The 1857 reconstruction of the 1796 Wearmouth Bridge is to the rear

The bridge was built as part of the infrastructure for the Monkwearmouth Junction Line, which opened in 1879; a connecting line across the River Wear to link line of the former Brandling Junction Railway at Monkwearmouth to the south bank at Sunderland and the line of the former Durham and Sunderland Railway.

The bridge was designed by T. E. Harrison: it consisted of a 300 ft (91 m) main span, an iron bowstring bridge, constructed from box girders connected by what would later be considered a Vierendeel truss with curved corner strengthening to create elliptical voids in the bracing. Harrison's design pre-dates Vierendeel's theoretical analysis of these structures by around 20 years. The iron bridge was supported 86 ft (26 m) above high water level on the Wear. At either end of the bridge were three 25 ft (7.6 m) span masonry arches. Hawks, Crawshay and Sons built the ironwork, John Waddell was contractor for the stonework. At the time of its construction it was claimed to be the largest hogsback iron bridge in the world.

The structure was grade II listed in 1978, planning consent was required for alterations to the structure circa 2000 for works relating to Metro construction: for the installation of overhead line electrification; and for the construction of a station (St Peter's Metro station), constructed on the northern approach viaduct of the bridge. In 2007 the bridge underwent repairs and strengthening, including the installation of 45 new transverse beams.

=== Use ===
The bridge and railway allowed trains to run directly from Newcastle to Hartlepool, by creating a through line from Newcastle to Sunderland.

Since 2002, the bridge has also carried the Tyne and Wear Metro. It is part of the modern (2012) Durham Coast Line.

Next bridge upstream	River Wear	Next bridge downstream
Vaux Bridge	Monkwearmouth Railway Bridge; Grid reference NZ396573	Wearmouth Bridge; A183 A1018 and 1
