= Hou Xun =

Chinese optical physicist

Hou Xun ([xôʊ ɕy̌n]; Chinese: 侯洵; born 6 December 1936) is a Chinese optical physicist, specializing in optoelectronics. He is a research professor and former director (1986–1995) of the Xi'an Institute of Optics and Precision Mechanics. He won the State Science and Technology Progress Award three times and was elected an academician of the Chinese Academy of Sciences in 1991.

== Early life and education ==
Hou was born 6 December 1936 in Lingbao, Henan, China, with his ancestral home in Xianyang, Shaanxi.

He graduated from the Department of Physics of Northwest University in Xi'an in 1959, and conducted research under Wang Chengshu at the Institute of Nuclear Energy of the Chinese Academy of Sciences (now China Institute of Atomic Energy) from 1960 to 1961. In March 1962, he began working at the Xi'an Institute of Optics and Precision Mechanics (XIOPM). From 1979 to 1981 he was a visiting scholar at the Physics Department of Imperial College London and conducted research in optics.

== Career ==
In 1982, he became Deputy Director of XIOPM, and was promoted to Director in June 1986, serving until March 1995. He was a professor at Northwest University and an adjunct professor at Xi'an Jiaotong University, the University of Science and Technology of China (USTC), and South China Normal University.

Hou's main research area is transient optics. He led or participated in the development of eight types of high-speed cameras, which have been used in nuclear tests. He served as chief scientist of the "Femtosecond Laser Technology and Ultrafast Process of the Climbing Project A", a large-scale research project on ultrafast phenomena. He also invented the Pd-Ag-O-Cs (Palladium-Silver-Oxygen-Caesium) photocathode and published more than 200 research papers.

Hou won the State Science and Technology Progress Award three times, and was awarded the Ho Leung Ho Lee Prize for Technological Sciences. He was elected an academician of the Chinese Academy of Sciences in 1991.
