= Fang Shouxian =

Chinese physicist (1932–2020)

- Born: October 28, 1932; Shanghai, China
- Died: January 19, 2020 (aged 87); Beijing, China
- Education: Fudan University
- Scientific career
- Fields: Particle accelerator
- Workplaces: Institute of High Energy Physics, Chinese Academy of Sciences (CAS)

Chinese name
- Traditional Chinese: 方守賢
- Simplified Chinese: 方守贤
Transcriptions
Standard Mandarin
- Hanyu Pinyin: Fāng Shǒuxián

Fang Shouxian (Chinese: 方守贤; October 28, 1932 – January 19, 2020) was a Chinese physicist who served as President of the Institute of High Energy Physics, Chinese Academy of Sciences (CAS).

== Biography ==
Fang was born in Shanghai, Republic of China, on October 28, 1932. After graduating from Fudan University in October 1955, he was assigned to the Institute of Modern Physics, Chinese Academy of Sciences (CAS). He worked in the Soviet Union between 1957 and 1960. After returning to China, he was again assigned to the Institute of Modern Physics. He joined the Chinese Communist Party on June 22, 1979. He served as vice-president of the Institute of High Energy Physics in 1986, and two years later was promoted to President. He died of illness in Beijing, on January 19, 2020.

== Honors and awards ==
- November 1991 Member of the Chinese Academy of Sciences (CAS)

Academic offices
Preceded by Ye Minghan	Director of the Institute of High Energy Physics, Chinese Academy of Sciences; 1988–1992	Succeeded by Zheng Zhipeng
