= Wearmouth Bridge =

Arch bridge over the River Wear

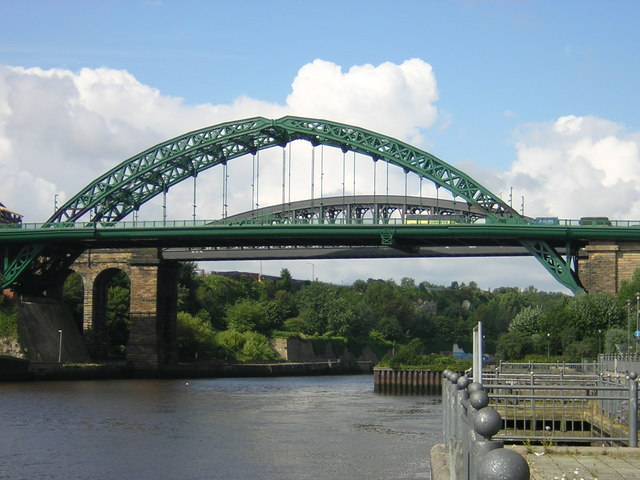
- Wearmouth Bridge in the foreground and the Monkwearmouth Railway Bridge in the background.
- Coordinates: 54°54′36″N 1°22′58″W
- OS grid reference: NZ396574
- Carries: A183 A1018; Motor vehicles; 1; Cycles; Pedestrians
- Crosses: River Wear
- Locale: Wearside
- Official name: Wearmouth Bridge
- Maintained by: Sunderland City Council
- Heritage status: Grade II listed building
- Next upstream: Monkwearmouth Railway Bridge

Characteristics
- Design: Through arch bridge
- Material: Iron
- Total length: 375 ft (114 m)
- Width: 48 ft (15 m)
- Longest span: 114 m (374 ft)
- Clearance below: 105 ft (32 m)
- No. of lanes: 5; 3 northbound; 2 southbound

History
- Designer: Mott, Hay and Anderson
- Constructed by: Sir William Arrol & Co.
- Construction start: 1927
- Construction end: 1929
- Construction cost: £231,943
- Opened: 1929
- Inaugurated: 31 October 1929
- Replaces: Wearmouth Bridge

Statistics

Listed Building – Grade II
- Official name: Wearmouth Bridge
- Designated: 17 October 1994
- Reference no.: 1279911

Location
- Interactive map of Wearmouth Bridge

Wearmouth Bridge is a through arch bridge across the River Wear in Sunderland, England. It is the final bridge over the river before its mouth with the North Sea.

== Original bridge ==
The original Wearmouth Bridge was designed by Rowland Burdon on a concept by Thomas Paine and opened in 1796. In 1805 the bridge was repaired, and between 1857 and 1859 it was reconstructed by Robert Stephenson.

== History ==
To accommodate the growing volume of traffic, construction began on the current bridge in 1927. It was designed by Mott, Hay and Anderson and fabricated by the famous bridge building firm of Sir William Arrol & Co. at their Dalmarnock Ironworks in Glasgow (they also built the famous Forth Bridge and the steel structure of Tower Bridge in London). The new bridge was built around the old one to allow the road to remain open. It was opened on 31 October 1929 by the Duke of York (who would later become King George VI).

The cost of the bridge amounted to £231,943 of which £12,000 was spent on dismantling the old bridge. The bridge carries the A183 road between Chester-le-Street and South Shields and the A1018 which was the old route of the A19 until the bypass was built leading to the Tyne Tunnel. It is a Grade II listed building. Sunderland City Council commissioned the building of Keel Crossing, a new pedestrian and cyclist bridge, in 2023 in order to reduce congestion on Wearmouth Bridge on matchdays.

A silhouette of the bridge appears on the Sunderland AFC crest since a 1997 redesign, along with the Penshaw Monument.

The adjoining Monkwearmouth Railway Bridge was built in 1879, and extended the railway south from Monkwearmouth to the centre of Sunderland.

== Gallery ==
Images of the Wearmouth Bridge
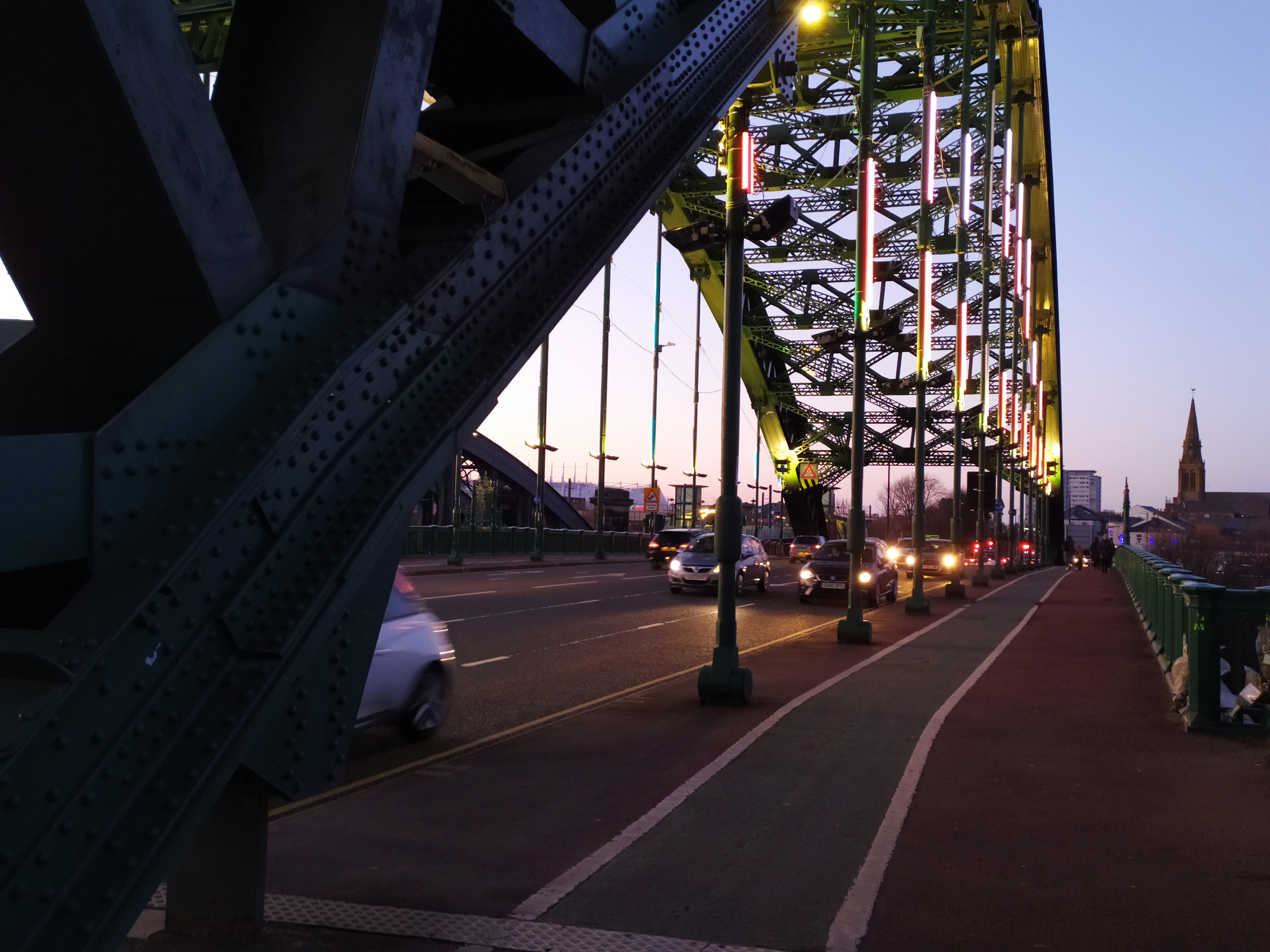
Looking north across the Wearmouth Bridge.

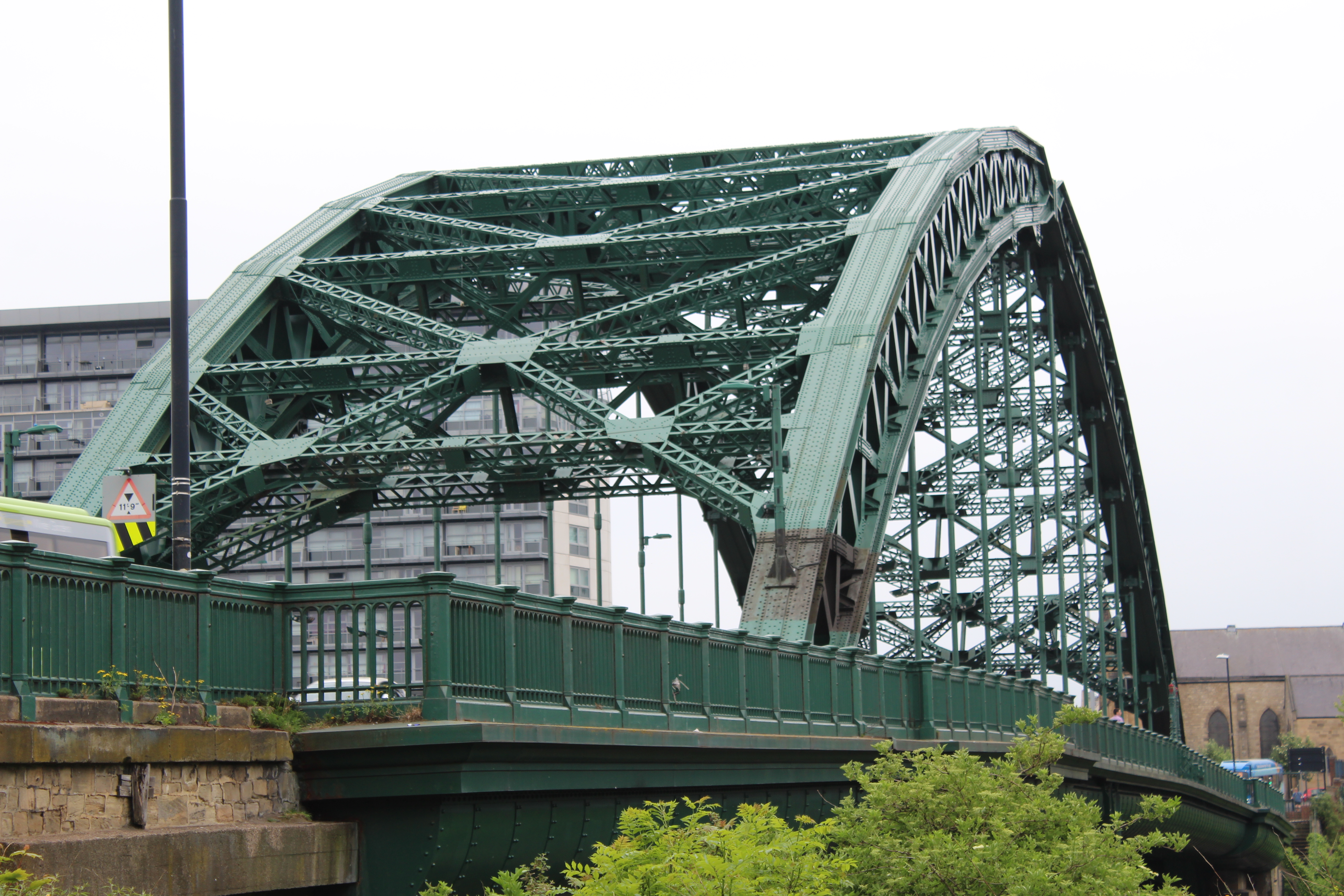
Looking south along the Wearmouth Bridge.

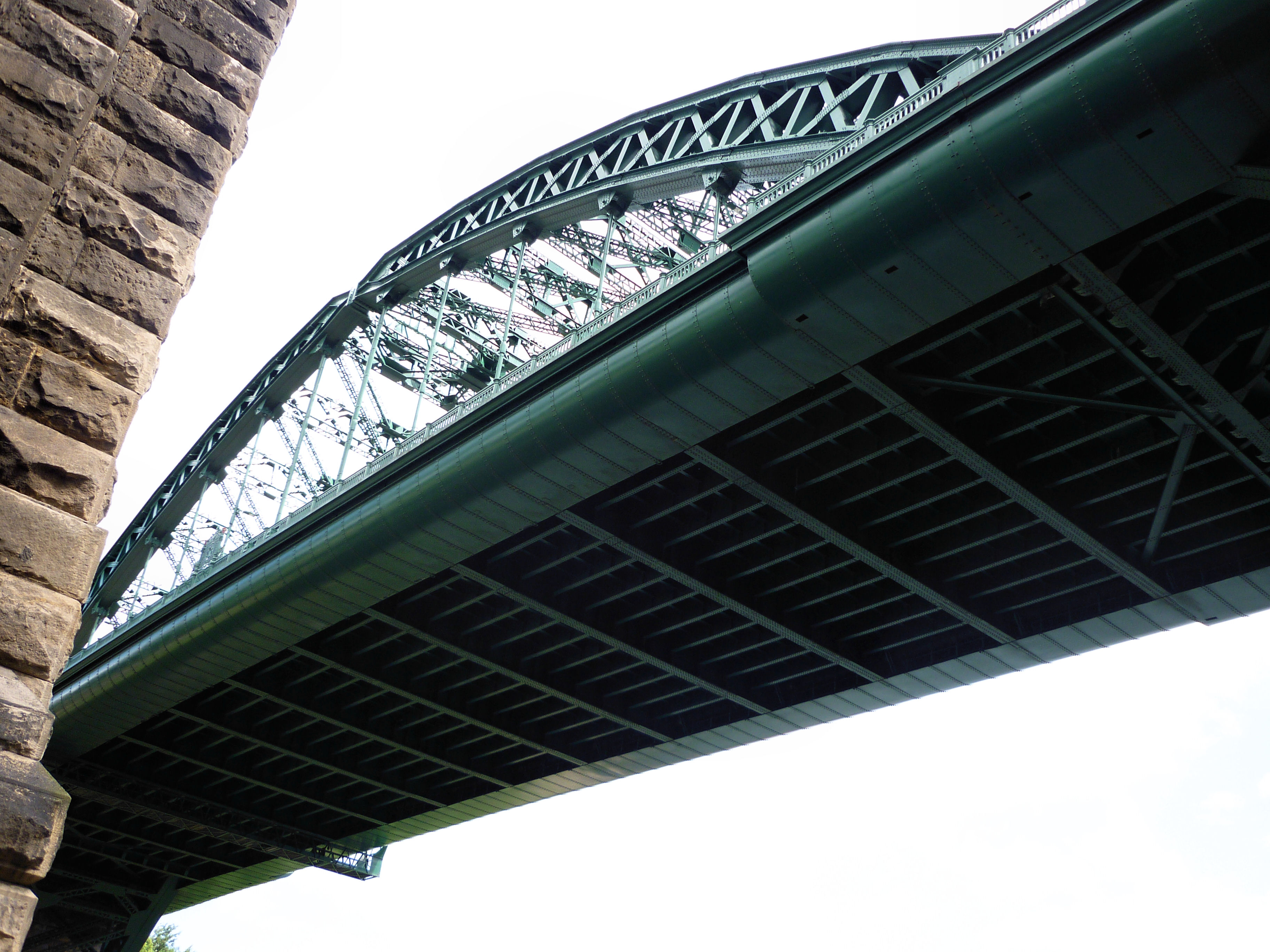
Underneath the Wearmouth Bridge

Next bridge upstream	River Wear	Next bridge downstream
Monkwearmouth Bridge; Durham Coast Line & Tyne and Wear Metro	Wearmouth Bridge; Grid reference NZ396574	None; North Sea
