= Wearmouth Bridge (1796) =

Bridge in England

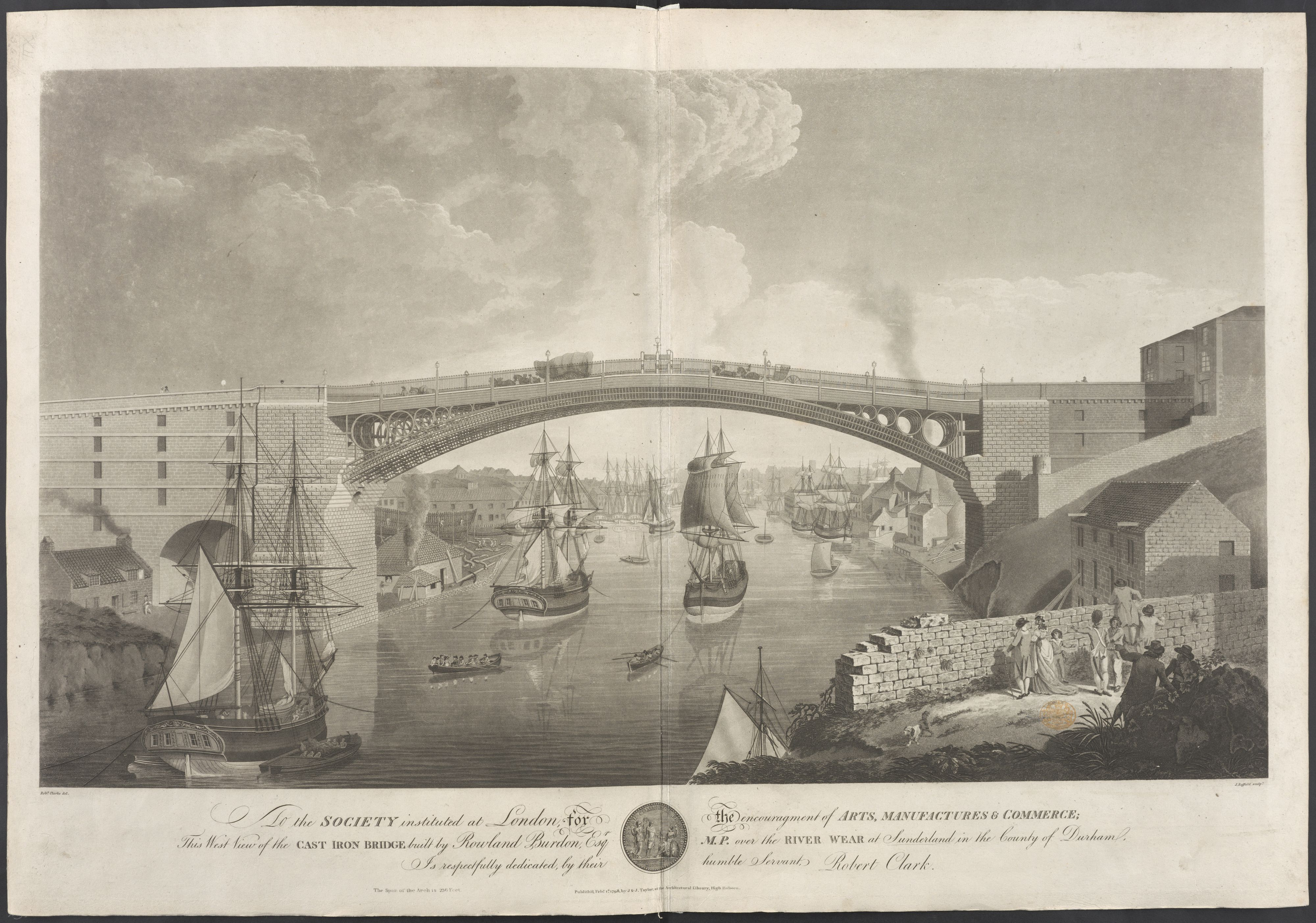
- West View of Wearmouth Bridge, published 1798
- Coordinates: 54°54′36″N 1°22′58″W

Characteristics
- Design: Single span
- Material: Cast iron
- Total length: 240 ft (73 m)

History
- Designer: Thomas Paine
- Constructed by: Thomas Wilson
- Construction cost: £28,000
- Opened: 1796
- Inaugurated: 9 August 1796
- Rebuilt: 1857-1859
- Demolished: 1927-1929
- Replaced by: Wearmouth Bridge

Location
- Interactive map of Wearmouth Bridge

The first Wearmouth Bridge was a bridge across the River Wear in Sunderland, England and the second major bridge to be made from cast iron. It was considered one of the wonders of the industrial age, and was described by Nikolaus Pevsner as being 'a triumph of the new metallurgy and engineering ingenuity [...] of superb elegance'.

== Design ==
The bridge was instigated, sponsored and patented by Rowland Burdon, the Member of Parliament for County Durham, and built under the direction of Thomas Wilson, who designed its architectural features.

It was the second iron bridge built after The Iron Bridge, but was over twice as long with a nominal span of 240 ft (73 m), and only three-quarters the weight. Indeed, at the time of building, it was the biggest single-span bridge in the world (72 m), matching the collapsed Trezzo Bridge in Italy.

The decision to use cast iron was strongly influenced by Thomas Paine, who had constructed a demonstration cast iron span of comparable length in Paddington in 1789, and had submitted models and designs for Wearmouth.

== Construction ==
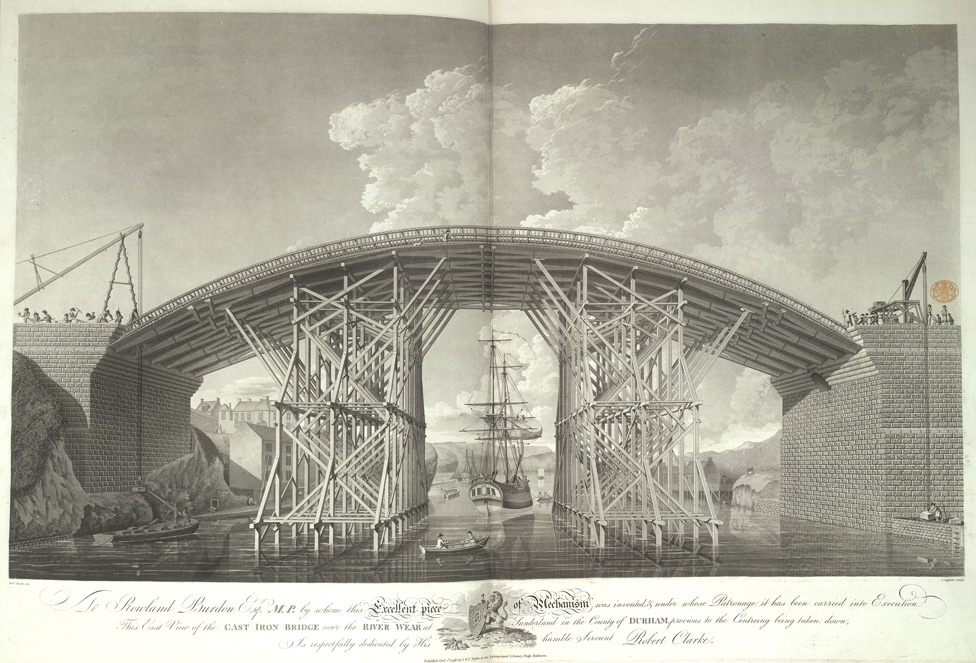
Engraving showing how the Bridge was constructed with supports that allowed full-sized ships to pass underneath

The foundation stone was laid in September 1793.

It is possible that two of the six main ribs used in the Wearmouth bridge, were created from the actual ribs used by Paine in his prototype, which had been returned to the Foundry in Rotherham where the ribs of both bridges were cast.

The bridge was opened in 1796.

== Impact ==
According to the plaque on the current bridge, its construction "proved to be a catalyst for the growth of Sunderland," since access between Monkwearmouth and Bishopwearmouth had previously only been by ferry, with the nearest bridge at Chester-le-Street.

== Operation ==
It opened to traffic on 9 August 1796, having cost a total of about £28,000.

There was originally a toll for traffic and pedestrians, although tolls for pedestrians were abolished in 1846.

== 1805 repair ==
In 1805 the bridge had to be repaired after heat from the sun caused some of the cross tubes to fall out.

== 1857 reconstruction and 1927 demolition ==
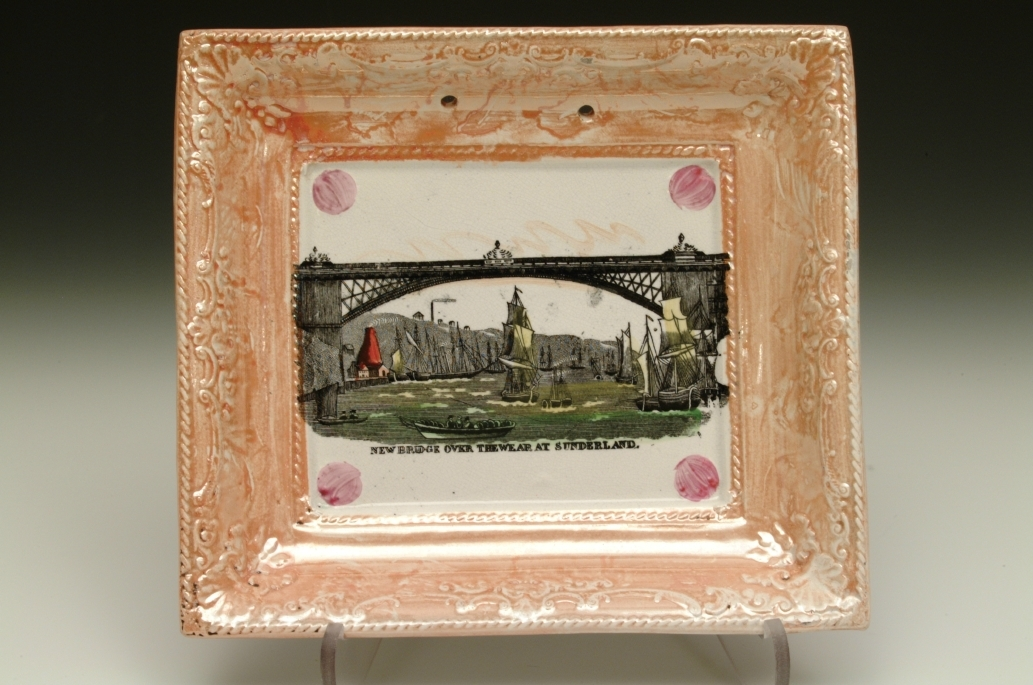
Commemorative plate showing the bridge as reconstructed in 1857

From 1857 to 1859 it was reconstructed by Robert Stephenson, who stripped the bridge back to its six iron ribs and levelled the roadway by raising the abutments. The bridge was reopened in March 1859, with the toll completely abolished in 1885.

The bridge was replaced by the current Wearmouth Bridge, built 1927-1929 at the same location.
