= Ye Minghan =

Chinese physicist (1925–2024)

- 叶铭汉
- Born: 2 April 1925; Shanghai, China
- Died: 4 October 2024 (aged 99); Beijing, China
- Education: National Southwestern Associated University; Tsinghua University
- Spouse: Yin Weiyi
- Scientific career
- Fields: High-energy physics
- Workplaces: Institute of High Energy Physics of the Chinese Academy of Sciences

Chinese name
- Simplified Chinese: 叶铭汉
- Traditional Chinese: 葉銘漢
Transcriptions
Standard Mandarin
- Hanyu Pinyin: Yè Mínghàn

Ye Minghan (Chinese: 叶铭汉; 2 April 1925 – 4 October 2024) was a Chinese physicist who served as director of the Institute of High Energy Physics of the Chinese Academy of Sciences from 1984 to 1988, and an academician of the Chinese Academy of Engineering. He was a member of the China Democratic League.

== Early life and career ==
Ye was born into an intellectual Family in Shanghai on 2 April 1925. His uncle Ye Qisun was an academician of the Chinese Academy of Sciences. He attended Sasaipo Elementary School (萨赛坡小学), Affiliated Middle School of Aurora University (now Shanghai Xiangming High School), and Affiliated High School of Utopia University (now Shanghai Datong High School).

Ye transferred to the Affiliated High School of the Normal College of Central University in 1942 and enrolled at National Southwestern Associated University in 1944. In April 1944, Ye participated in the Youth Expeditionary Force and was assigned to the First Temporary Automobile Regiment of the Chinese Army stationed in British India.

In May 1946, Ye was accepted to the School of Science, Tsinghua University, and worked at the Institute of Modern Physics, Chinese Academy of Sciences after graduating in 1950. Ye was an assistant researcher at the Institute of Physics, Chinese Academy of Sciences in 1953 and subsequently assistant researcher at the Institute of Atomic Energy, Chinese Academy of Sciences in 1958.

In 1964, Ye went to the countryside to participate in the socialist education movement and was sent to the May Seventh Cadre Schools to do farm works in Qianjiang County (now Qianjiang), Hubei in 1969.

Ye was reinstated as an associate researcher of the Institute of High Energy Physics, Chinese Academy of Sciences in 1973 and rose to become director in 1984. Ye was a visiting scholar at Princeton University in 1979, visiting professor at the University of Utah in 1981, and visiting professor at Brookhaven National Laboratory from 1990 to 1993.

== Personal life and death ==
Ye was married to Yin Weiyi (殷蔚薏).

On 4 October 2024, Ye died in Beijing at the age of 99.

== Honours and awards ==
- 1990 State Science and Technology Progress Award (Special Prize) for the Beijing Electron Positron Collider and Beijing Spectrometer.
- 1995 Member of the Chinese Academy of Engineering (CAE)

Academic offices
Preceded by Zhang Wenyu	Director of the Institute of High Energy Physics, Chinese Academy of Sciences; 1984–1988	Succeeded by Fang Shouxian
