= Wang Chengshu =

Female Innovator in China

- Wang Chengshu (second from the left) together with Deng Jiaxian, Yang Zhenning and Zhang Wenyu in Chinese Academy of Sciences
- Died: June 18, 1994 (aged 81)
- Other names: C.S. Wang Chang Cheng-Shu Wang Chang Mrs. Chang

Wang Chengshu
- Traditional Chinese: 王承書
- Simplified Chinese: 王承书
Transcriptions
Standard Mandarin
- Hanyu Pinyin: Wáng Chéngshū

Wang Chengshu, also known as Cheng-Shu Wang Chang, was a Chinese physicist known for her work on the kinetic theory of gas molecules and for separation of uranium isotopes. She was elected to the Chinese Academy of Sciences in 1980.

== Early life and education ==
Chengshu was born on June 26, 1912. She graduated from Yenching University in 1934 where she received the highest grades. While teaching as an assistant lecturer from 1934 until 1937, she worked on her master's degree from Yenching University which she would earn in 1936. From 1938 until 1939, Chengshu taught at Xiangya Medical College. She moved to the University of Michigan in 1941 where she studied with George Uhlenbeck. She earned her doctorate from the University of Michigan in 1944. While at Michigan she was a Barbour Scholar, a program designed to support students from Asia and the Middle East.

== Career ==
Chengshu would remain in Michigan for the ten years following her Ph.D. During this time she spent two periods at the Institute for Advanced Study in Princeton, NJ, 1945 to 1946 and 1948 to 1949. She returned to China in 1956 where she worked at the Institute of Modern Physics of the Chinese Academy of Sciences while concurrently serving as a professor at Peking University. In 1958, she was transferred to the thermonuclear fusion Laboratory of the Institute of Atomic Energy to do theoretical work, and in 1959, she was assigned to the Soviet Atomic Energy Research Institute. From 1964 until 1978 she worked at the Third Research Institute of the Second Ministry of Machinery Industry.

In 1978 she was named a professor at Qinghua University and she served as a researcher of the Ministry of Nuclear Industry until 1986.

== Research ==
During her time in the United States, Chengshu mainly engaged in the study of kinetic theory of gas molecules. In 1948, she discovered an error in the Burnett equations, which was later corrected. She was the first to calculate the eigenvalue for solving the Boltzmann equation, and developed the generalized Boltzmann equation for polyatomic gases, which resulted in it being called the Wang-Chang-Uhlenbeck ("WCU") equation.

Upon returning to China in 1958 she began working on the theory of uranium isotope separation, and ultimately laid the foundation for the research of controlled nuclear fusion reactions and plasma physics in China. After 1961, she began to do uranium isotope separation work in the highly classfied Plant 504 in Lanzhou, Gansu province, which ultimately led to the production of enriched uranium. In 1964 China launched its first atomic bomb, and Chengshu was hailed by Mao Zedong as a female hero due to her role in this test.

== Personal life ==
She married the physicist Zhang Wenyu in 1939.

== Death ==
Chengshu died on June 18, 1994.

== Selected publications ==
- Wang Chang, C. S.; Uhlenbeck, George Eugene (1951). "Transport phenomena in polyatomic gases" (PDF). Technical Report University of Michigan.
  - later published as Wang, C. S. (1964). "The heat conductivity and viscosity of poly-atomic gases". Studies in Statistical Mechanics. 2. North-Holland, Amsterdam: 247–277.
- Wang Chang, C.S. (1964). "The Heat Conductivity and Viscosity of Poly-Atomic Gases". Studies in Statistical Mechanics. 2: 241–268.
- Chang, Chʻêng-shu Wang; Uhlenbeck, George Eugène (1970). The Kinetic Theory of Gases. Amsterdam: North-Holland. ISBN 0-444-10008-3.
- Ying, Chuntong; Cunzhen yi, Zhang; Chengshu, Wang (1994). 气体运动论 : 王承书论文选集 / Qi ti yun dong lun (Kinetic theory of gases) (in Chinese). 原子能出版社, Beijing Shi. ISBN 9787502211790. OCLC 34556478.

== Honors and awards ==
Chengshu was elected to the Chinese Academy of Sciences in 1980.
