= John Waddell (engineer) =

Scottish railway engineer (1828–1888)

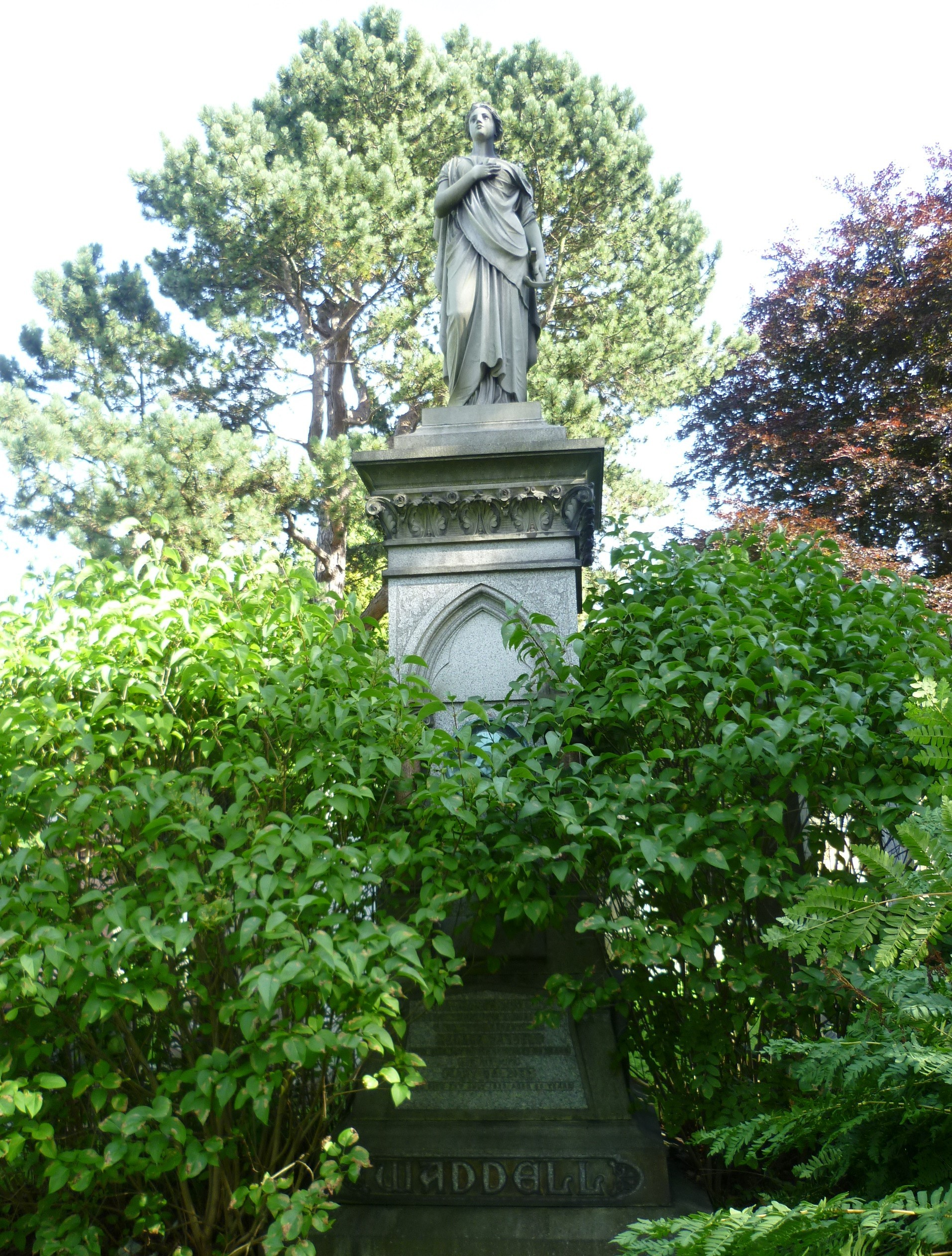
Waddell's grave in the Dean Cemetery, Edinburgh

John Waddell (1828–1888) was a Scottish railway contractor based in Edinburgh. He was born in the parish of New Monkland on 16 August 1828, the son of George Waddell and his wife Elizabeth Shanks, of the farm of Gain or Gane. He married Margaret Donald (1831-1892) on 15 June 1852.

== Biography ==
He ran the enterprising and respected firm John Waddell & Sons and went on to complete many routes during the rise of the railways across England during the late 19th century, especially for the NER.

Notable examples of his work include the rebuilding of Putney Bridge in London (1882), the Scarborough & Whitby Railway, completion of the Whitby Redcar and Middlesbrough Union Railway and the Mersey Railway tunnel. His company also built part of the approaches to the Forth Bridge.

On 17 February 1883 an agreement was reached with John Waddell to construct a tunnel under the River Thames between Tilbury and Gravesend, work which would have carried trains through to Dover for a potential Channel tunnel, although that proposal was eventually dropped.

== Death ==
He died at his home, 4 Belford Park, Edinburgh on 17 January 1888, aged 60. He left three sons – George, Robert and John, who carried on his business after his death – and six daughters, Anne (wife of Joseph Allan Currie), Elizabeth, Margaret (wife of Sir Thomas Kennedy Dalziel), Agnes Russell MB (wife of Hope Gibson CBE), Jane and Janet (wife of John Rebbeck Garrod).

He is buried on a prominent corner on the west side of Dean Cemetery opposite "Lords Row".
