= Zhang Wenyu =

- 张文裕
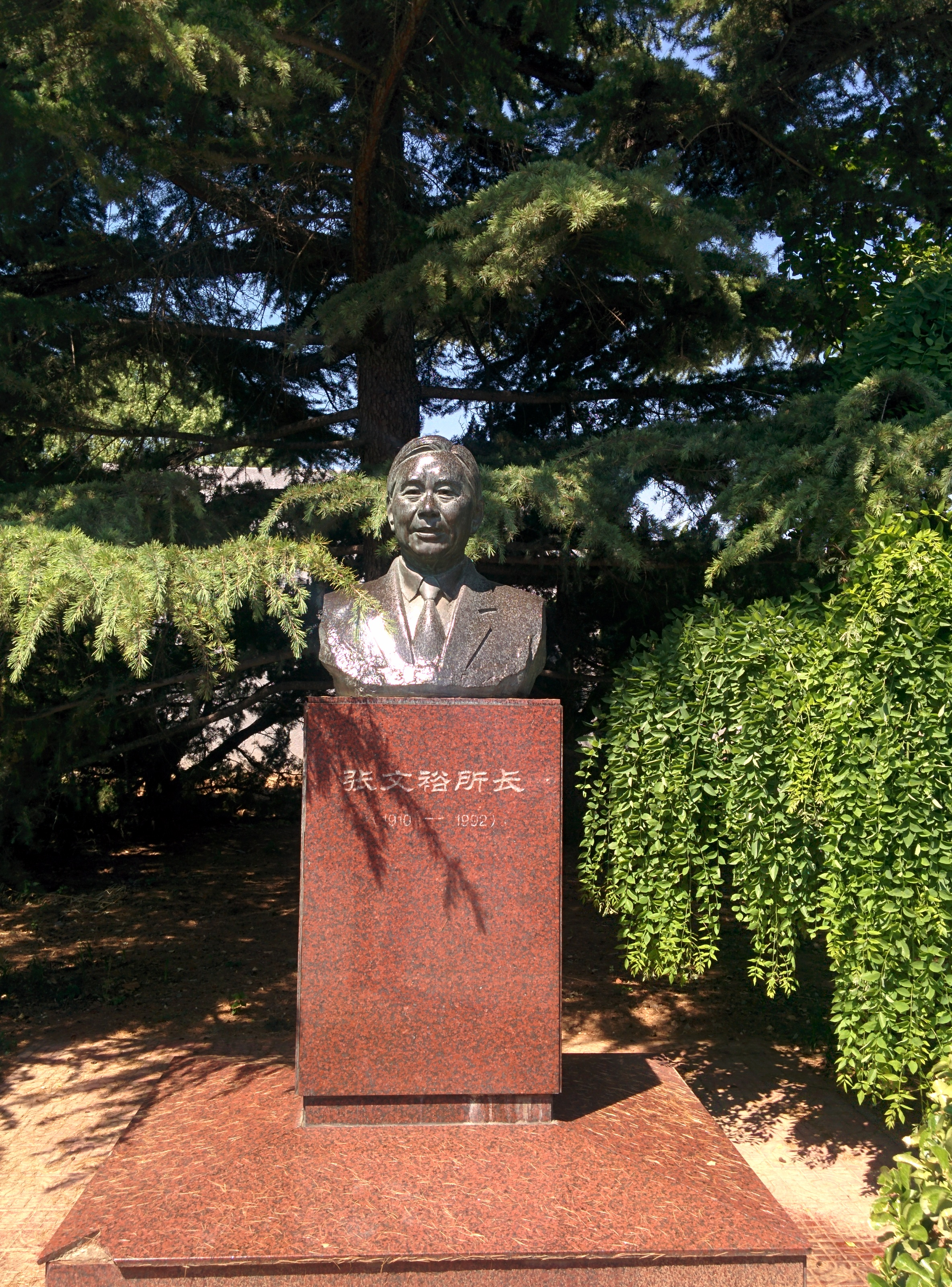
- Bronze statue of Zhang Wenyu
- Born: 9 January 1910; Hui'an County, Fujian, Qing China
- Died: 5 November 1992 (aged 82); Beijing, China
- Education: Yenching University; University of Cambridge
- Spouse: Wang Chengshu
- Scientific career
- Fields: Particle physics
- Workplaces: Institute of Physics, Chinese Academy of Sciences
- Doctoral advisor: Ernest Rutherford
- Notable students: Tsung-Dao Lee; Yang Chen-Ning; Tang Aoqing

Chinese name
- Simplified Chinese: 张文裕
- Traditional Chinese: 張文裕
Transcriptions
Standard Mandarin
- Hanyu Pinyin: Zhāng Wényù
Southern Min
- Hokkien POJ: Tiuⁿ Bûn-jū
- Tâi-lô: Tiunn Bûn-jū

Zhang Shaoyue
- Simplified Chinese: 张少岳
- Traditional Chinese: 張少岳
Transcriptions
Standard Mandarin
- Hanyu Pinyin: Zhāng Shàoyuè
Southern Min
- Hokkien POJ: Tiuⁿ Siáu-ga̍k
- Tâi-lô: Tiunn Siáu-ga̍k

Zhang Wenyu (9 January 1910 – 5 November 1992) was a Chinese physicist who served as director of the Institute of High Energy Physics from 1973 to 1984. He was one of the founders of cosmic ray research and high energy experimental physics in China. He was an academician of the Chinese Academy of Sciences.

== Biography ==
Zhang was born into a peasant family in the town of Tuzhai, in Hui'an County, Fujian, on 9 January 1910. He had seven siblings. He attended Shihua School (时化小学). He secondary studied at Quanzhou Peiyuan High School (泉州培元中学). After graduating from Yenching University in 1931, he stayed at the university and worked as assistant. In 1934, he pursued advanced studies in the United Kingdom on Boxer Indemnities, earning a doctor's degree from the University of Cambridge under the supervision of Ernest Rutherford in 1938.

Zhang returned to China in November 1938. After the introduction of Wu Youxun, he became a professor at Sichuan University in Chengdu. Six months later, he was recruited as a physics professor at National Southwestern Associated University.

In 1943, he joined the faculty of Princeton University, he remained at the university until 1950. Then he moved to Purdue University as a professor. In 1947, he found out in his experiment μ Subatomic and μ Emission of subatomic energy level transitions γ X-ray breaks through the Rutherford–Bohr model and opened up a new field of strange atom research.

After the founding of the Communist State in 1949, he repeatedly applied for a return license, but did not receive responses. In 1956, he and his wife finally received return licenses. He took his family aboard the "President Cleveland" steamship to Hong Kong and returned to Beijing. He became researcher at the Institute of Physics, Chinese Academy of Sciences. That same year, he was invited to visit the European Organization for Nuclear Research. He also served as a professor at the University of Science and Technology of China since 1958.

In 1961, he was sent to the Soviet Union, where he worked at the Joint Institute for Nuclear Research as a researcher as well as leader of the China Group.

Zhang returned to China in 1964 and continued to work at the Chinese Academy of Sciences, where he was appointed deputy director of the China Institute of Atomic Energy and director of the Cosmic Ray Laboratory. After this office was terminated in 1973, he became director of the Institute of High Energy Physics, serving until 1984. He concurrently served as director of the Department of Modern Physics, University of Science and Technology of China between 1978 and 1984. He participated in the construction of Beijing Electron–Positron Collider II.

On 5 November 1992, he died of illness in Beijing, aged 82.

He was a delegate to the 2nd National People's Congress, 3rd National People's Congress, 4th National People's Congress, 5th National People's Congress and 6th National People's Congress. He was a member of the 4th, 5th and 6th Standing Committee of the National People's Congress.

== Personal life ==
Zhang married Wang Chengshu, who was also a physicist and academician of the Chinese Academy of Sciences.

== Honours and awards ==
- 1957 Member of the Chinese Academy of Sciences (CAS)

Academic offices
New title	Director of the Institute of High Energy Physics, Chinese Academy of Sciences; 1973–1984	Succeeded by Ye Minghan
