= The Iron Bridge =

Bridge across the River Severn in Shropshire, England

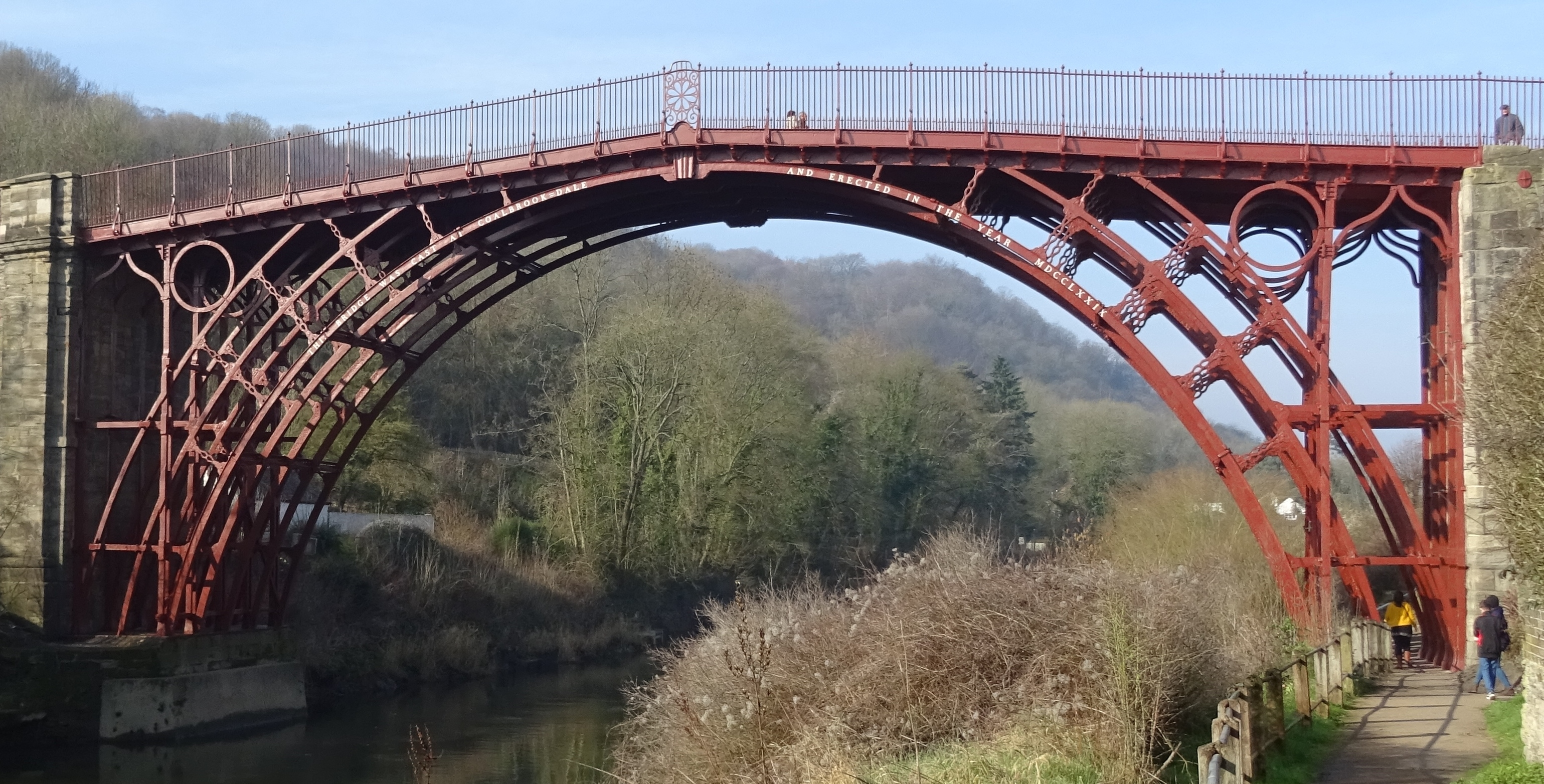
- The Iron Bridge (February 2019)
- Coordinates: 52°37′38″N 2°29′08″W
- Carries: Pedestrian traffic
- Crosses: River Severn
- Locale: Ironbridge Gorge, Ironbridge
- Owner: Telford and Wrekin Council

Characteristics
- Design: Cast-iron truss arch bridge
- Longest span: 100 ft 6 in (30.63 m)

History
- Designer: Thomas Farnolls Pritchard
- Constructed by: Abraham Darby III
- Fabrication by: Abraham Darby III
- Construction start: November 1777
- Construction end: July 1779
- Opened: 1 January 1781

Statistics
- Toll: Free public access since 1950

Scheduled monument
- Official name: The Iron Bridge
- Designated: 18 January 1934; 92 years ago
- Reference no.: 1015325

Listed Building – Grade I
- Official name: The Iron Bridge
- Designated: 8 April 1983; 43 years ago
- Reference no.: 1038659

Location
- Interactive map of The Iron Bridge

The Iron Bridge is a cast iron arch bridge that spans the Ironbridge Gorge of the River Severn in Shropshire, England. Opened in 1781, it was the first major bridge in the world to be made of cast iron. Its success inspired the widespread use of cast iron as a structural material, and today the bridge is celebrated as a symbol of the Industrial Revolution.

The geography of the deep Ironbridge Gorge, formed by glacial action during the last ice age, meant that there are industrially useful deposits of coal, iron ore, limestone, and fire clay present near the surface where they are readily mined, but also that it was difficult to build a bridge across the river at this location. To cope with the instability of the banks and the need to maintain a navigable channel in the river, a single-span iron bridge was proposed by Thomas Farnolls Pritchard. After initial uncertainty about the use of iron, construction took place over two years, with Abraham Darby III responsible for the ironwork. The bridge crosses the Ironbridge Gorge with a main span of 100 ft 6 in (30.63 m), allowing sufficient clearance for boats to pass underneath.

In 1934 it was designated a scheduled monument and closed to vehicular traffic. Tolls for pedestrians were collected until 1950, when the bridge was transferred into public ownership. After being in a poor state of repair for much of its life, extensive restoration works in the latter half of the 20th century have protected the bridge. The bridge, the adjacent settlement of Ironbridge and the Ironbridge Gorge form the UNESCO Ironbridge Gorge World Heritage Site.

== History ==
=== Background ===
The Ironbridge Gorge (previously Severn Gorge) was formed at the end of the last ice age by the overflowing of Lake Lapworth, which resulted in the exposure of useful deposits of resources such as coal, iron ore, fire clay and limestone near the surface where they were readily mined. With the river providing a means of transport, the local area was an important centre of the emerging Industrial Revolution.

Abraham Darby I first smelted local iron ore with coke made from Coalbrookdale coal in 1709, and in the coming decades Shropshire became a centre for industry due to the low price of fuel from local mines. The River Severn was used as a key trading route, but it was also a barrier to travel around the deep Ironbridge Gorge, especially between the then important industrial parishes of Broseley and Madeley, the nearest bridge being at Buildwas 2 miles (3.2 km) away. The Iron Bridge was therefore proposed to link the industrial town of Broseley with the smaller mining town of Madeley and the industrial centre of Coalbrookdale. The use of the river by boat traffic and the steep sides of the gorge meant that any bridge should ideally be of a single span, and sufficiently high to allow tall ships to pass underneath. The steepness and instability of the banks was problematic for building a bridge, and there was no point where roads on opposite sides of the river converged.

The Iron Bridge was the first of its kind to be constructed, although not the first to be considered nor the first iron bridge of any kind. An iron bridge was partly constructed at Lyon in 1755, but was abandoned for reasons of cost, and a 72-foot-10-inch-span (22.2 m) wrought iron footbridge over an ornamental waterway was erected in Kirklees, Yorkshire, in 1769.

=== Proposal ===
In 1773, architect Thomas Farnolls Pritchard wrote to his 'iron mad' friend and local ironmaster, John Wilkinson of Broseley, to suggest building a bridge out of cast iron. Although he specialised in the design of chimneypieces and other items of interior decoration, and in funerary monuments, he had also previously designed both wooden and stone bridges.

During the winter of 1773–74, local newspapers advertised a proposal to petition Parliament for leave to construct an iron bridge with a single 120-foot (37 m) span. In 1775, a subscription raised funds of between £3,000 and £4,000 (equivalent to £365,000 to £487,000 in 2016), and Abraham Darby III, the grandson of Abraham Darby I and an ironmaster working at Coalbrookdale, was appointed treasurer to the project.

In March 1776, the Benthall Bridge, Severn Act 1776 (16 Geo. 3. c. 17) giving authorisation to build a bridge received royal assent. It had been drafted by Thomas Addenbrooke, secretary of the trustees, and John Harries, a London barrister, (Note: Harries may have been related to the local Reverend Harries.) then presented to the House of Commons by Charles Baldwyn, MP for Shropshire. Abraham Darby III was commissioned to cast and build the bridge. In May 1776, the trustees withdrew Darby's commission, and instead advertised for plans for a single arch bridge to be built in "stone, brick or timber". No satisfactory proposal was made, and the trustees agreed to proceed with Pritchard's design, but there was continued uncertainty about the use of iron, and conditions were set on the cost and duration of the construction. In July 1777 the span of the bridge was decreased to 90 feet (27 m), and then increased again to 100 feet 6 inches (30.6 m), possibly in order to accommodate a towpath. (Note: For a fuller description of the background of the construction of the bridge, see Cossons & Trinder 2002, pp. 9–18.)

== Construction ==
Construction of the bridge

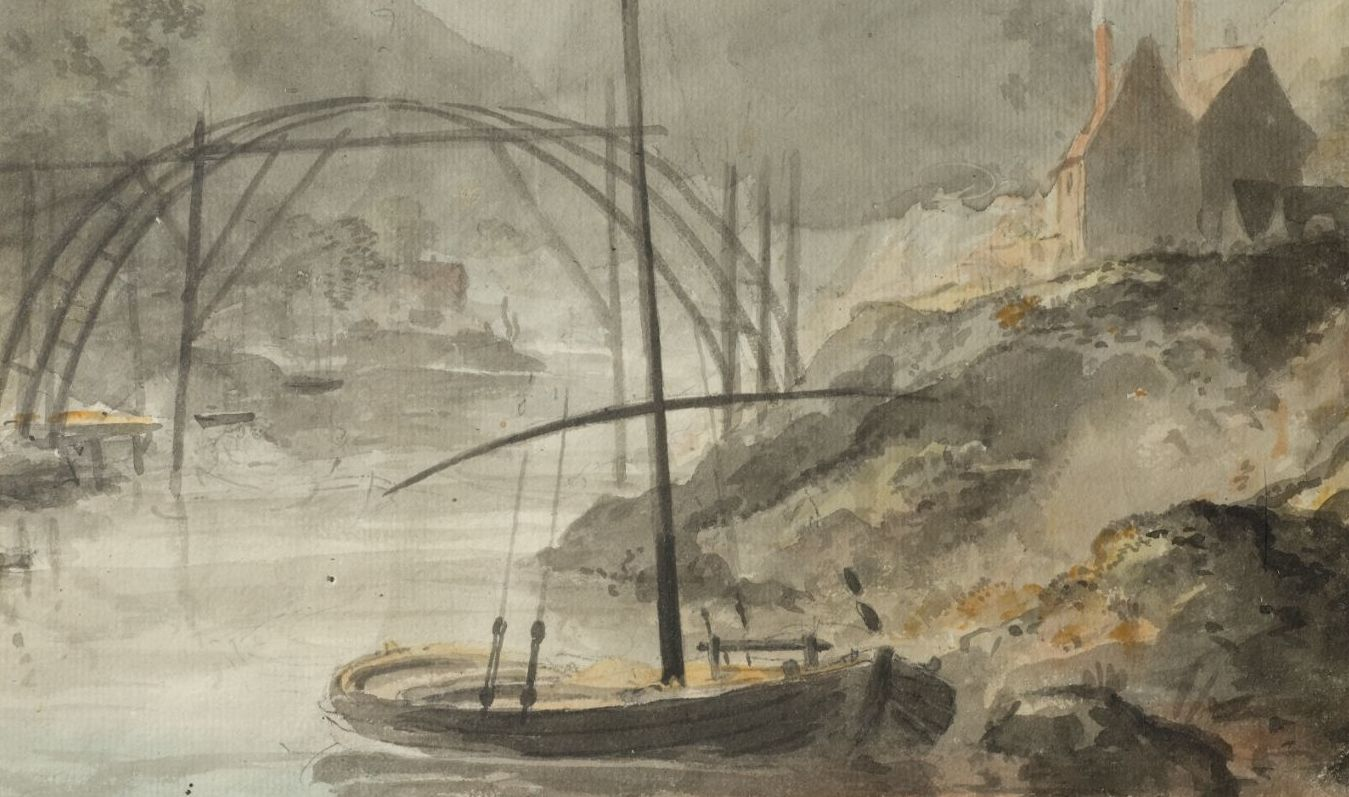
1779 painting of the bridge by the Swedish painter Elias Martin, the only known of the bridge's construction.

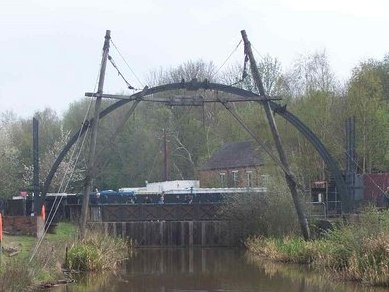
A modern-day reconstruction of how the Iron Bridge was assembled at Blists Hill Victorian Town in Telford, Shropshire.

The site, adjacent to where a ferry had run between Madeley and Benthall, was chosen for its high approaches on each side and the relative solidity of the ground. The Benthall Bridge, Severn Act 1776 described how the bridge was to be built from a point in Benthall parish near the house of Samuel Barnett to a point on the opposite shore near the house of Thomas Crumpton. Pritchard died on 21 December 1777 in his towerhouse at Eyton on Severn, only a month after work had begun, having been ill for over a year.

The bridge is built from five sectional cast-iron ribs that give a span of 100 feet 6 inches (30.6 m). The construction of the bridge used 378 long tons 10 cwt (847,800 lb or 384.6 t) of iron, and there are almost 1,700 individual components, the heaviest weighing 5 long tons 5 cwt (11,800 lb or 5.3 t). Components were cast individually to fit with each other, rather than being of standard sizes, with discrepancies of up to several centimetres between 'identical' components in different locations.

The masonry and abutments were constructed between 1777 and 1778, and the ribs were lifted into place in the summer of 1779. The bridge first spanned the river on 2 July 1779, and it was opened to traffic on 1 January 1781. In 1997, a watercolour by Elias Martin was discovered in a Stockholm museum, which showed the bridge under construction in 1779. The painting shows a moveable wooden scaffold consisting of derrick poles standing in the river bed being used as a crane to position the half-ribs of the bridge, which had been taken to the site by boat from Darby's foundry 500 metres (1,600 ft) downstream. Using the approach depicted in the painting, a half-size replica of the main section of the bridge was built in 2001 as part of the research for the BBC's Timewatch programme, which was shown the following year.

=== Design ===
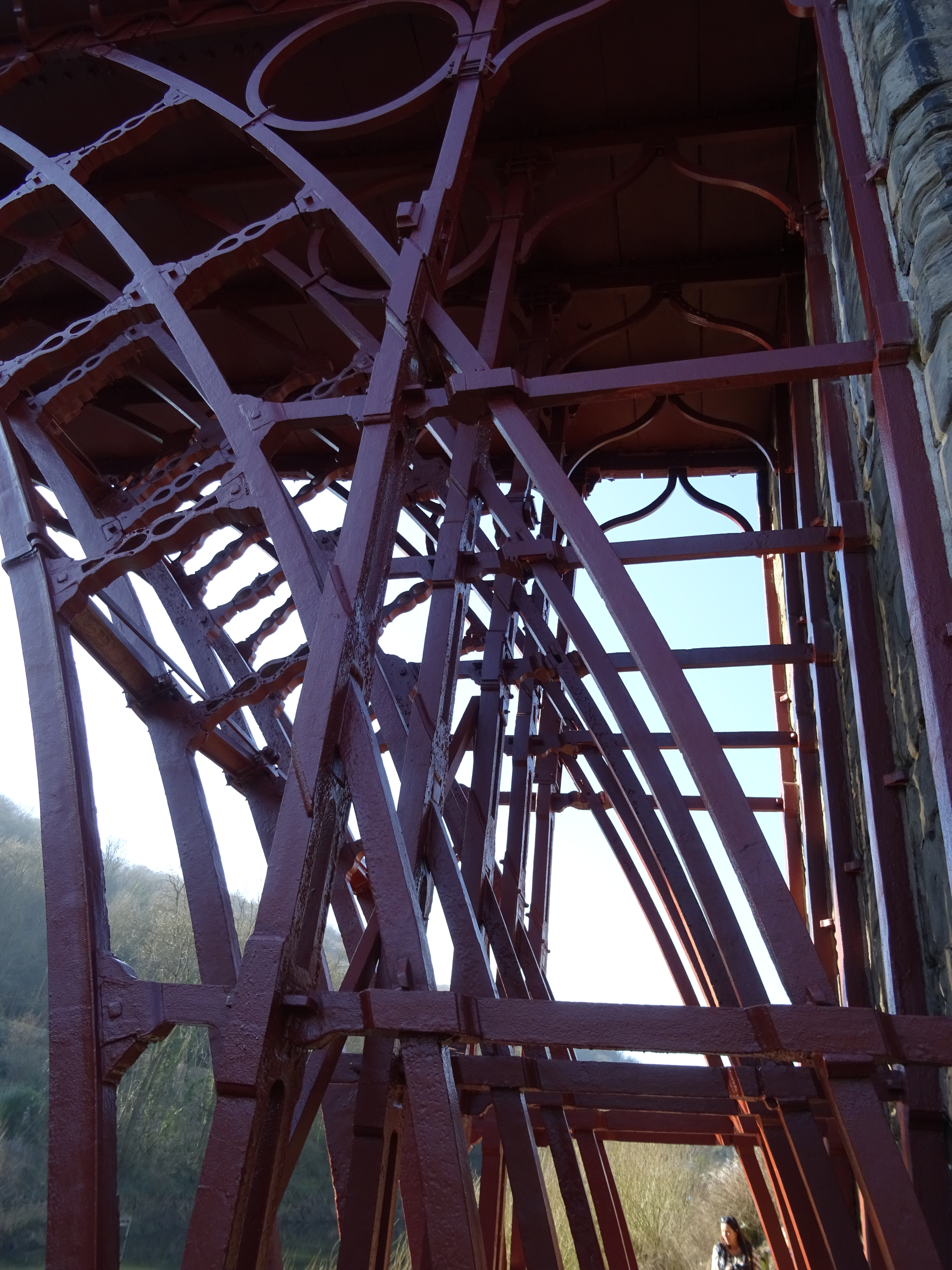
Structural detail of the arches

The bridge is to a carpenters' design typically used for wood structures, built from five sectional cast-iron ribs that give a span of 100 feet 6 inches (30.63 m). The interlocking rings between the arches make this a truss arch. Exactly 378 long tons 10 cwt (847,800 lb or 384.6 t) of iron was used in the construction of the bridge, and there are almost 1,700 individual components, the heaviest weighing 5.5 long tons (5.6 tonnes). Components were cast individually to fit with each other, rather than being of standard sizes, with discrepancies of up to several centimetres between 'identical' components in different locations.

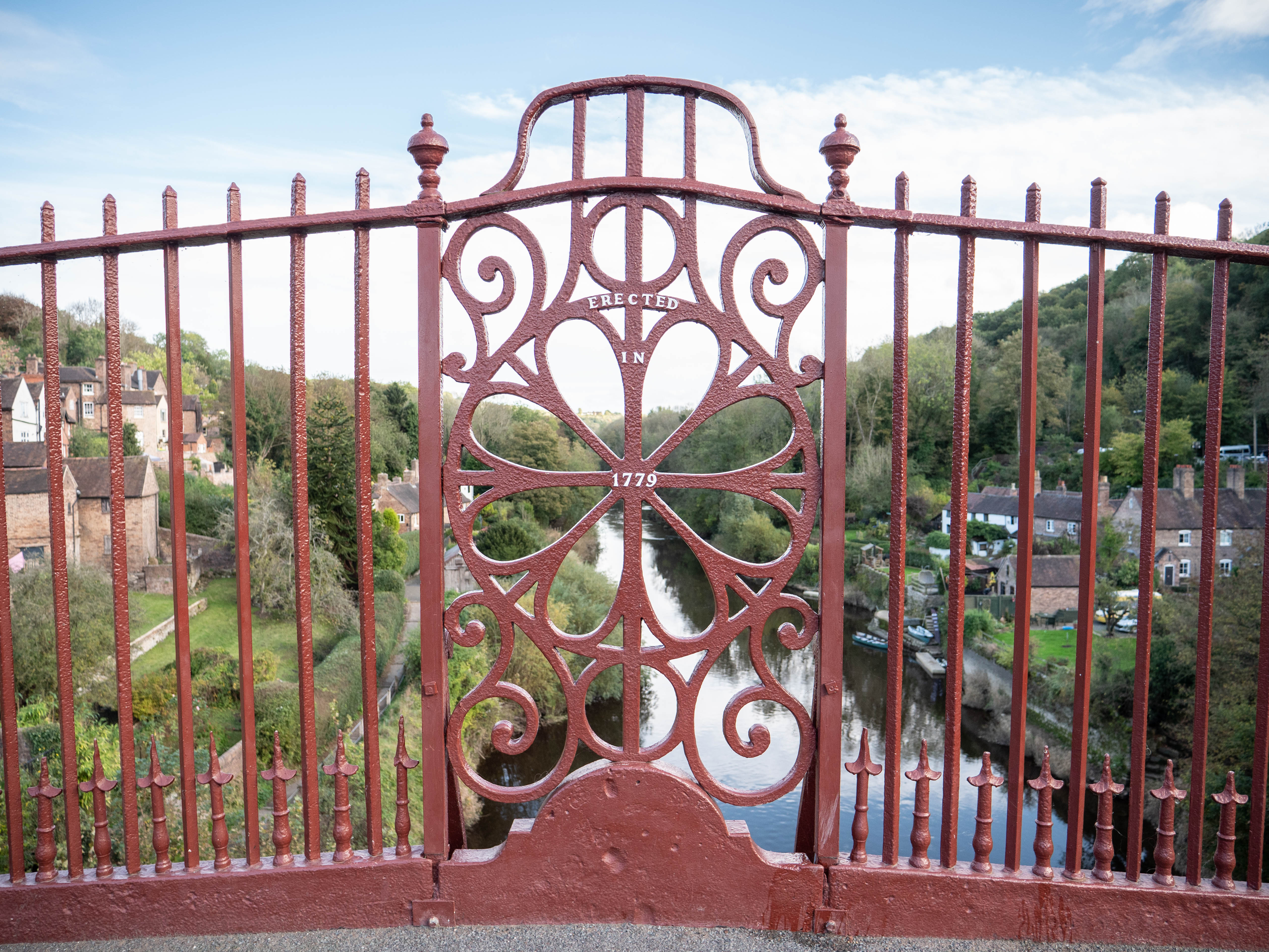
Central decorative railings

Decorative rings and ogees between the structural ribs of the bridge suggest that the final design was Pritchard's, as the same elements appear in a gazebo he rebuilt. A foreman at the foundry, Thomas Gregory, drew the detailed designs for the members, resulting in the use of carpentry jointing details such as mortise and tenon joints and dovetails.

The two outer ribs are engraved with the words: "This bridge was cast at Coalbrook-Dale and erected in the year MDCCLXXIX" (Roman numerals for 1779).

Two supplemental arches, of similar cast iron construction, carry a towpath on the southern bank and also act as flood arches. A stone arch with a brick vault carries a small path on the northern (town side) bank.

=== Material ===
The Iron Bridge is made of cast iron. This is immensely strong in compression, but performs less well than steel and wrought iron when subjected to tension or bending moments, because of its brittleness and lower tensile strength. Analysis of an arch and a strut from the Iron Bridge revealed the following elemental compositions:

Element	Proportion	
Element	Arch	Strut
Carbon	2.65%	3.25%
Silicon	1.22%	1.48%
Manganese	0.46%	1.05%
Sulphur	0.102%	0.037%
Phosphorus	0.54%	0.54%

The presence of 0.1% sulphur in cast iron is at the upper limit of what is acceptable, but the presence of sufficient manganese leads to the formation of harmless manganese sulphide. (Note: For further information about the processing of the iron used in the bridge, see Tylecote, R. F. (1992). A History of Metallurgy, Second Edition. London: Maney Publishing)

Puddled wrought iron was a much better structural material than cast iron but not widely available until after 1800, eventually becoming the preferred material for bridges, rails, ships and buildings until new steel making processes such as the Bessemer process were developed in the late 19th century.

=== Cost ===
Darby had agreed to construct the bridge with a budget of £3,250 (equivalent to £426,353 in 2023) (Note: According to the Bank of England inflation calculator. Retrieved 29 March 2023) and this was raised by subscribers to the project, mostly from Broseley. While the actual cost of the bridge is unknown, contemporary records suggest it was as high as £6,000 (£787,113 in 2023), and Darby, who was already indebted from other ventures, agreed to cover the excess. However, by the mid-1790s the bridge was highly profitable, and tolls were giving the shareholders an annual dividend of 8 per cent.

== Later history ==
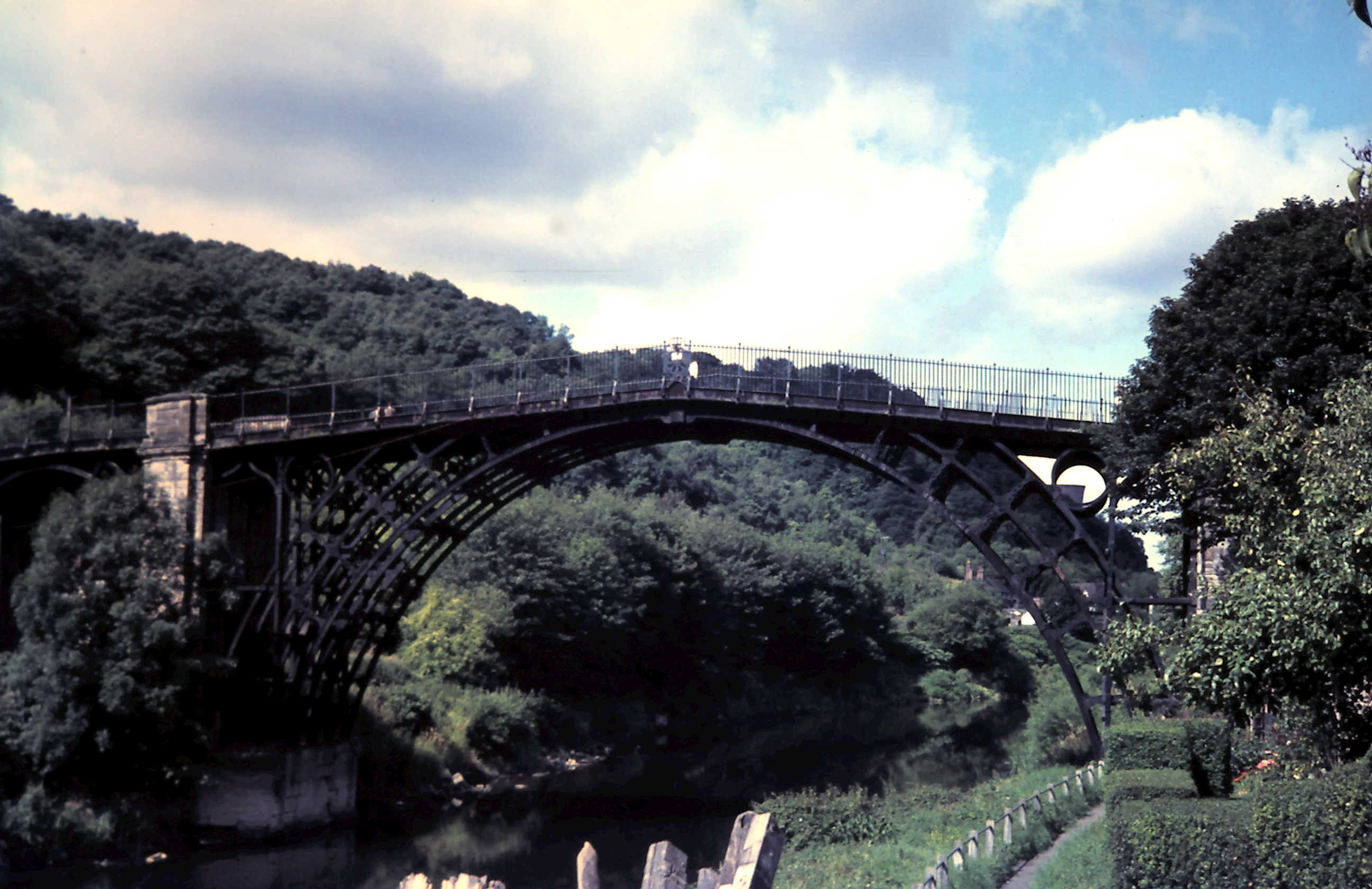
The Iron Bridge in 1970

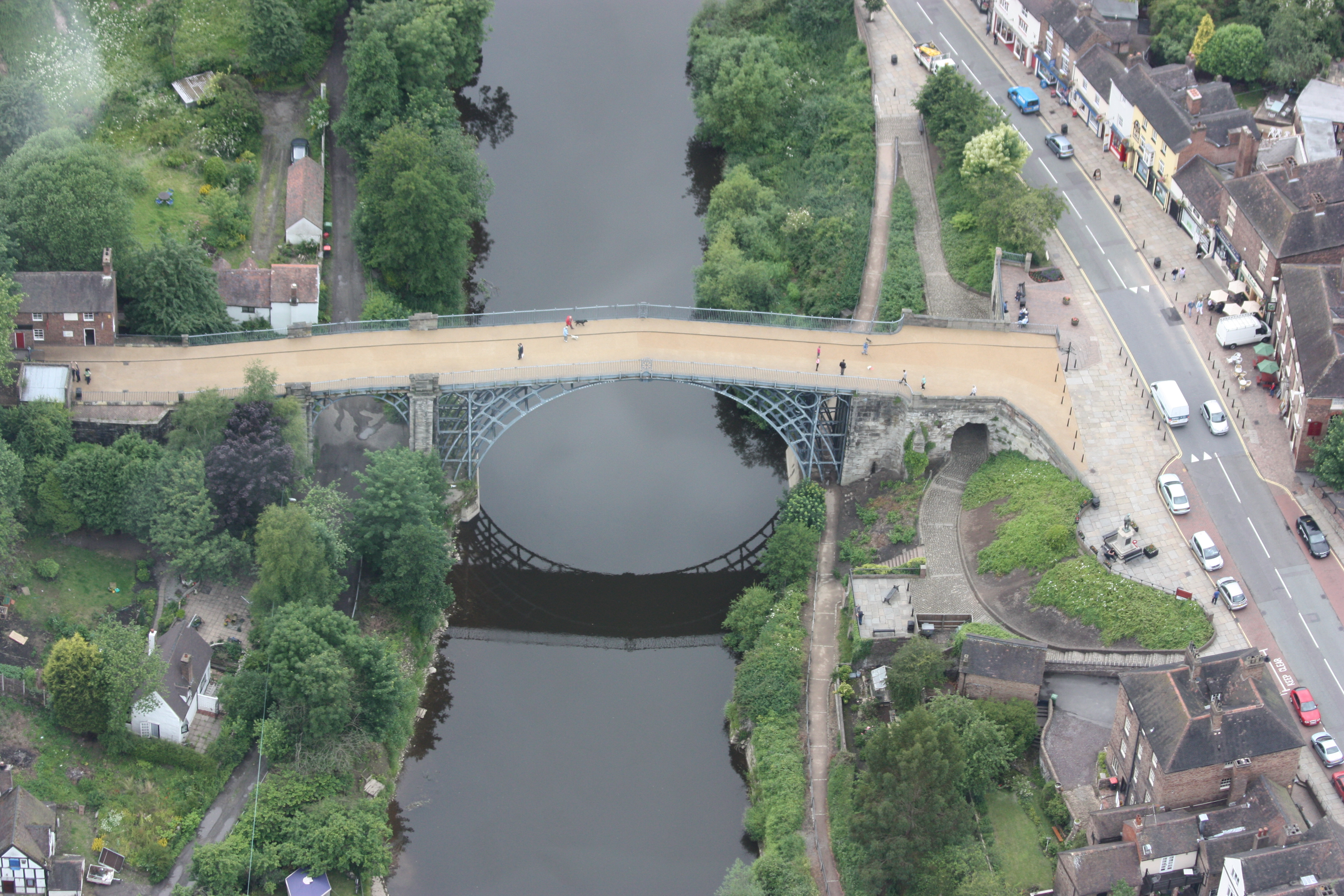
Aerial view of the Iron Bridge in 2008

The opening of the bridge resulted in changes in the pattern of settlement in the gorge, and roads around the bridge were improved in the years after its construction. The town of Ironbridge, taking its name from the bridge, developed at the northern end. The trustees, as well as local hotel keepers and coach operators, promoted interest in the bridge among members of high society.

=== Repairs ===
In July 1783, a 35-yard (32 m) wall was built in order to prevent the north bank from slipping into the river. Cracks were found in the stone land arch on the south side in December 1784, and the neighbouring abutment showed signs of movement. The gorge is very prone to landslides, and over 20 are recorded in the British Geological Survey's National Landslide Database in the area. It was suspected that the sides of the gorge were moving towards the river, forcing the feet of the arch towards each other, and consequently repairs were carried out in 1784, 1791 and 1792.

It was the only bridge on the River Severn to survive the flood of February 1795 undamaged, due to its strength and small profile against the floodwaters. The medieval bridge at Buildwas was replaced with a cast iron bridge by Thomas Telford, which, by virtue of superior design, required half the quantity of iron despite a longer span of 128 feet (39 m). The Buildwas Bridge survived until 1906. Contrary to a common misconception, Telford was not responsible for the construction of the bridge itself.

In 1800 the trustees commissioned repairs which lasted for several years, which involved the replacement of the stone land arches with wooden ones to relieve pressure on the main span. A proposal to build a rigid support between the abutments to keep them apart was found to be impossible with the available technology, but was achieved during the later restoration of the bridge in the 1970s. In 1812, its construction was described as "very bad" by Charles Hutton, and he predicted that it would not last for long, "though not from any deficiency in the iron-work", but due to cracks that had appeared in the stonework. The timber arches were replaced with cast iron ones in December 1820, and further repairs were necessary throughout the remainder of the 19th century.

Around 1870, “Sir B. Baker stated that it had required patching for ninety years, because the arch and the high side arches would not work together. Expansion and contraction broke the high arch and the connexions between the arches. When it broke they fished it. (Note: Spanning a crack by bolting a pair of 'fishplates' across it.) Then the bolts sheared or the ironwork broke in a new place. He advised that there was nothing unsafe; it was perfectly strong and the stress in vital parts moderate. All that needed to be done was to fish the fractured ribs of the high arches, put oval holes in the fishes, and not screw up the bolts too tight."

On 24 August 1902, a 30-foot (9.1 m) length of parapet collapsed into the river, and a section of deck plate weighing around 5 long hundredweight (250 kg) fell from the bridge in July 1903. The opening of a toll-free concrete bridge in 1909 caused concern among the trustees, but it continued to be used by vehicles and pedestrians.

=== Closure to vehicles ===
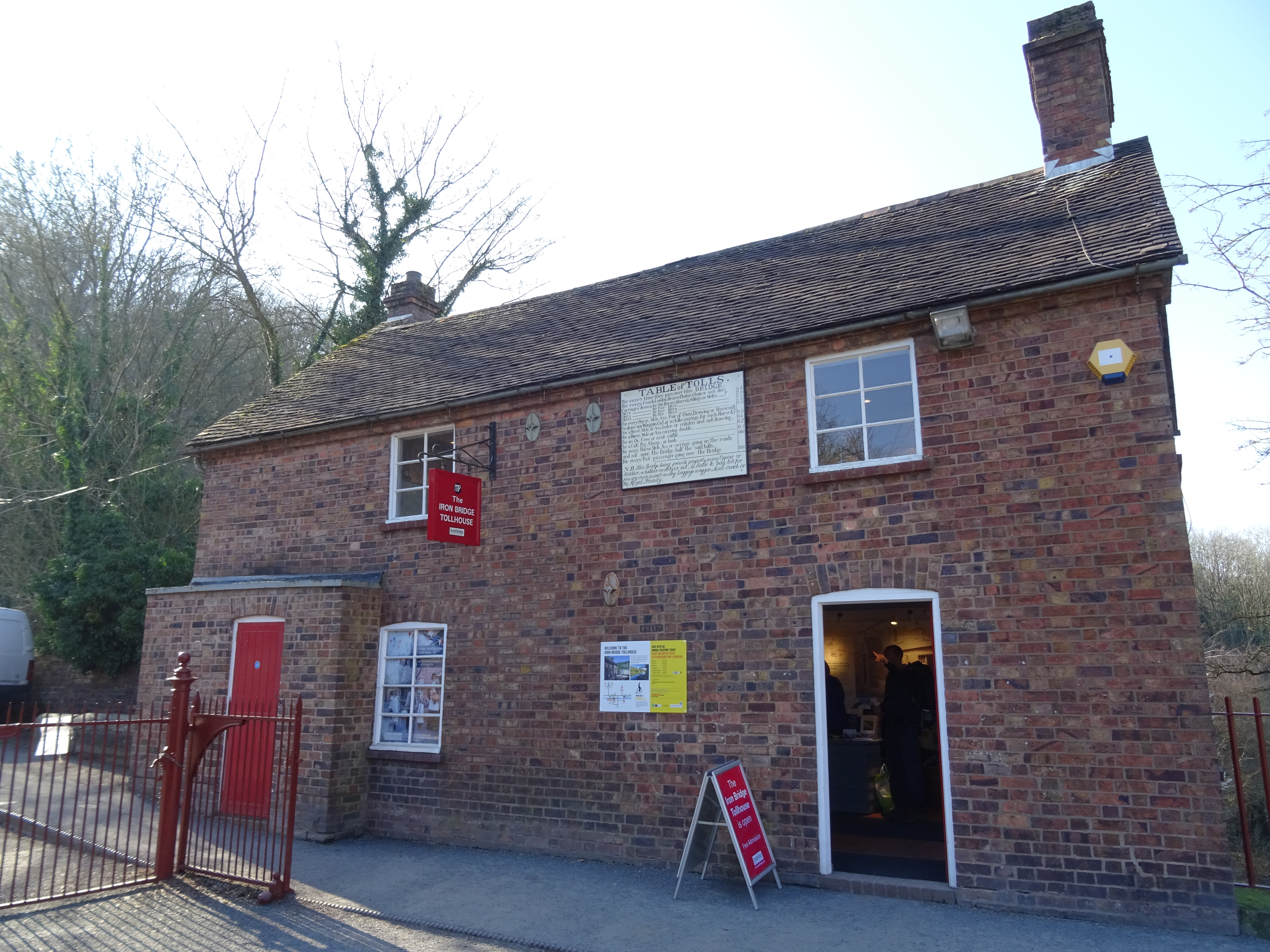
Iron Bridge Tollhouse

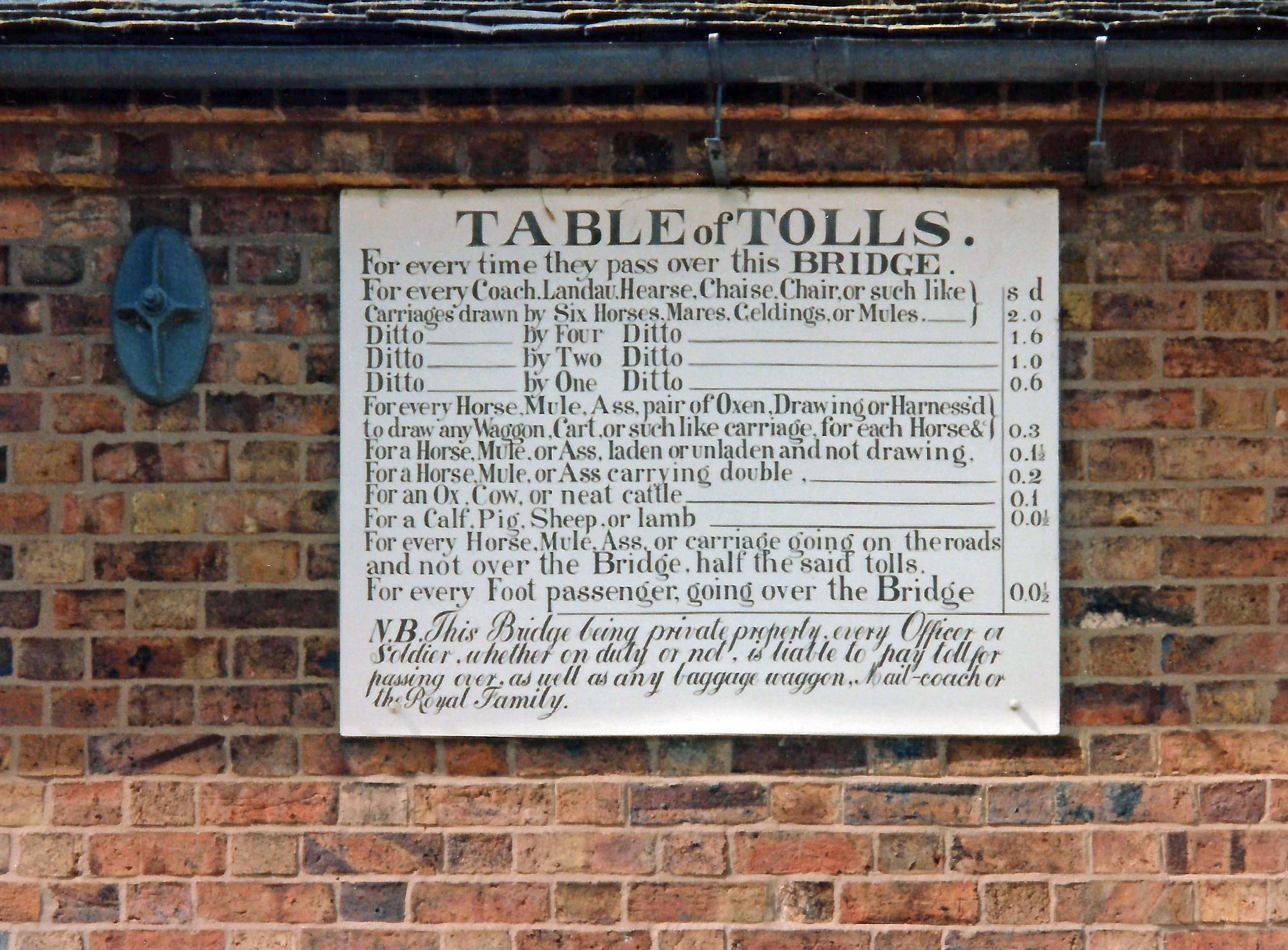
The historic table of tolls

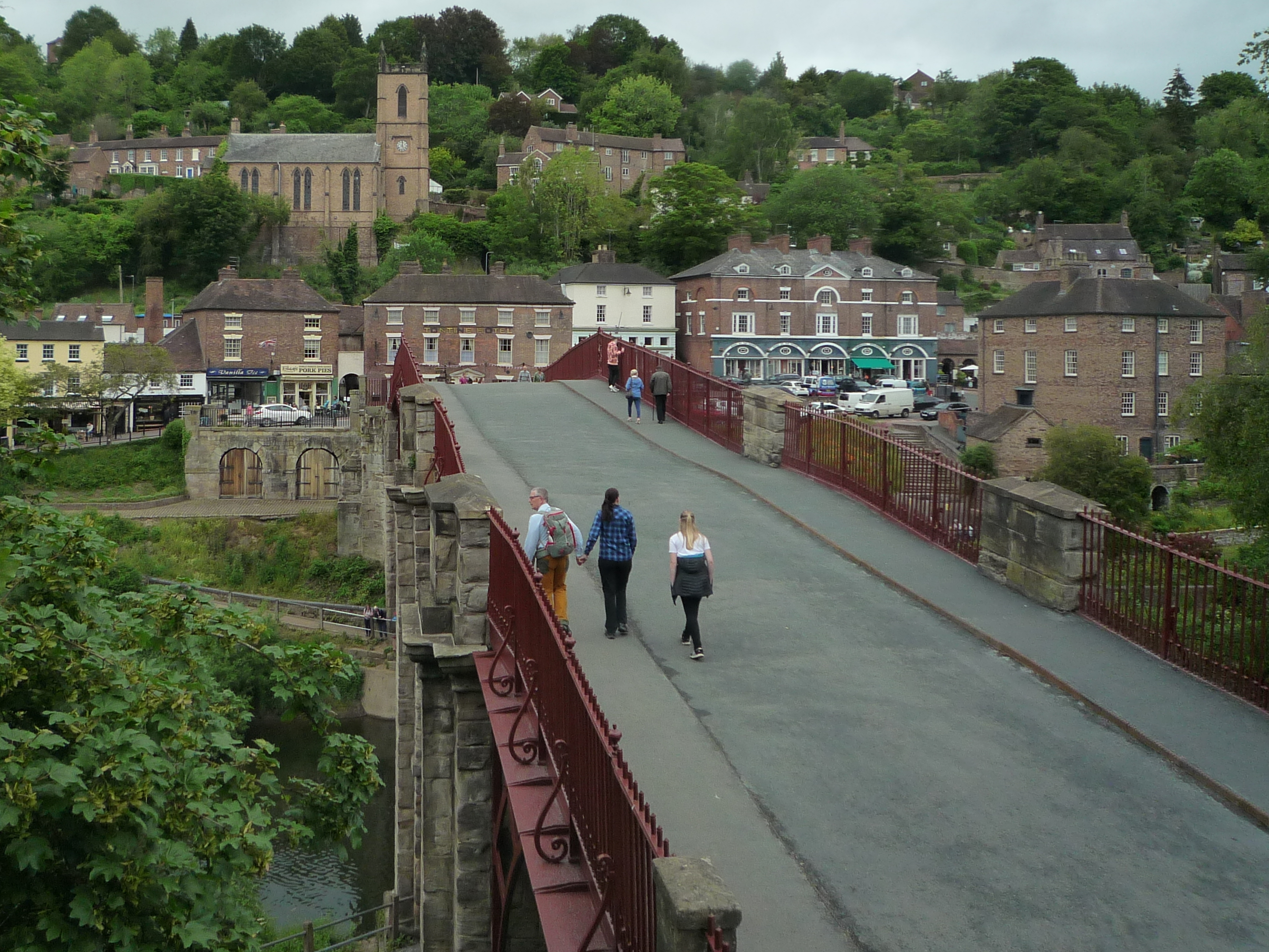
Pedestrians on the bridge in 2019

A 1923 report by engineering consultants Mott, Hay and Anderson suggested that other than the paintwork, the main span of the bridge was in good condition. It was suggested that the metal deck of the bridge was dangerously heavy, and that after removing the dead weight the bridge should be reopened to vehicles no heavier than 2 tons and restricted to the centre of the roadway. A weight limit of 4 tons was imposed, but the housing boom of the 1930s meant that drivers distributing tiles produced at Jackfield were insistent that they should be allowed to use the bridge, so the trustees took the decision to close it to vehicular traffic with effect from 18 June 1934. Tolls for pedestrians were collected until 1950, when ownership of the bridge was transferred to Shropshire County Council. The tolls collected only marginally covered the cost of collection, leaving no budget for conservation, and the bridge had not been cleaned or painted for many years. Due to its poor condition, between the 1940s and 1970s a number of suggestions were made to scrap and replace the bridge, or move it to a different location. In 1956 the county council made a proposal to demolish the bridge and replace it with a new one, but this plan did not come to fruition. The Ironbridge Gorge Museum Trust was set up in 1967 with the aim of protecting industrial heritage in the Ironbridge Gorge, and was able to secure funding from the council to carry out repairs.

=== Restoration ===
Renovations to The Iron Bridge

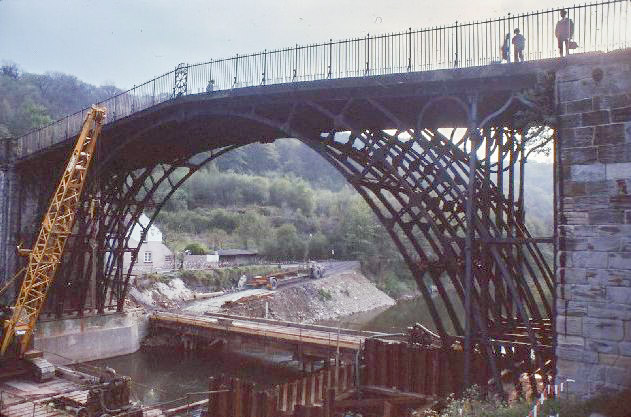
The Iron Bridge being repaired in 1974

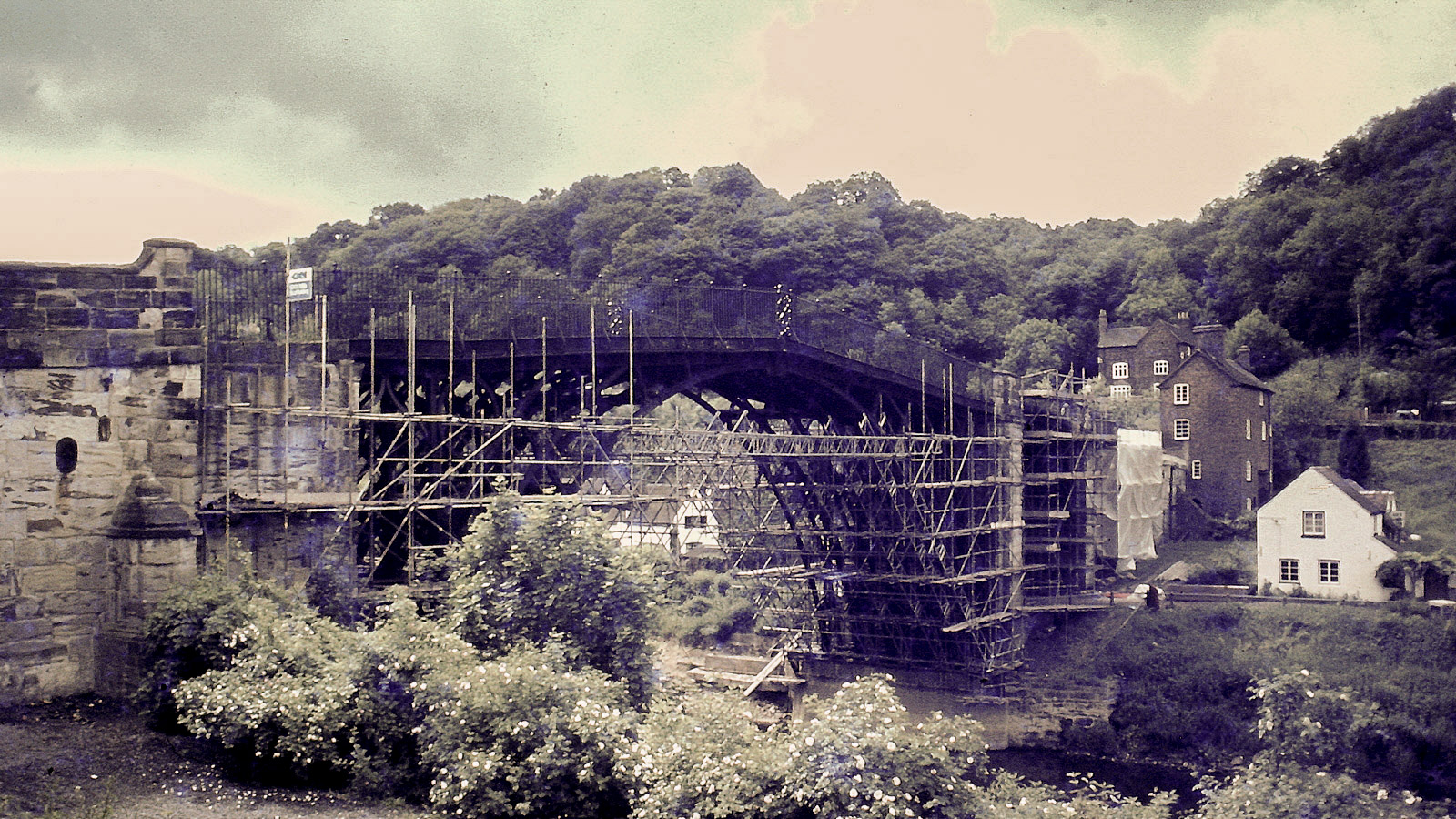
The Iron Bridge being repainted in 1980

With funding from Shropshire County Council, the Historic Buildings Council for England, and the nascent Ironbridge Gorge Museum Trust, a programme of repairs took place on the foundations of the bridge at a cost of £147,000 between 1972 and 1975. The consulting engineers Sandford, Fawcett, Wilton and Bell decided to place a ferro-concrete inverted arch under the river to counter inward movement of the bridge abutments. The arch was built by the Tarmac Construction Company, starting in the spring of 1973, but unusually high summer floods washed over the cofferdam, frustrating hopes that the work could be done in a single summer. Filling material was removed from the south abutment to reduce its weight, and the arch through it was reinforced with concrete. The road surface was replaced with a lighter tarmac, the stone of the abutments was renewed and the toll-house was restored as an information centre. In 1980, the structure was painted for the first time in the 20th century, and the work was complete for the bicentenary of the opening, which was celebrated on 1 January 1981.

Before and after restoration

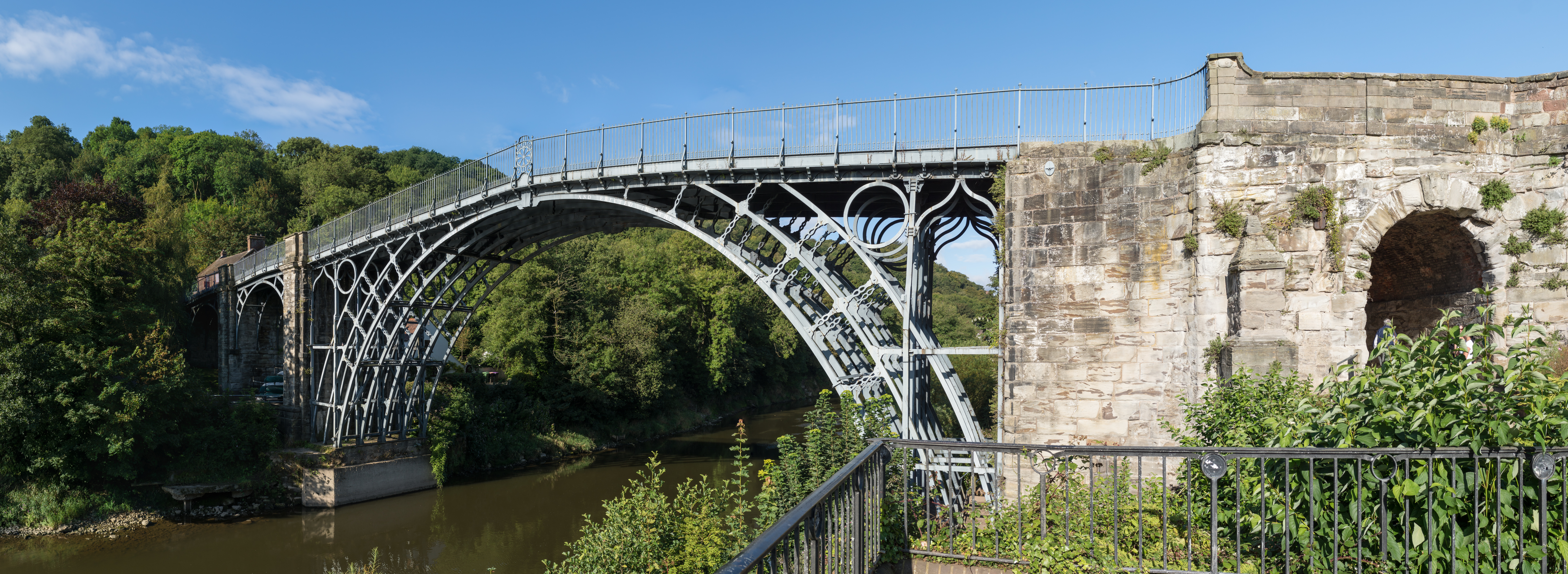
blue-grey was the colour of the bridge before restoration (image taken 2014).

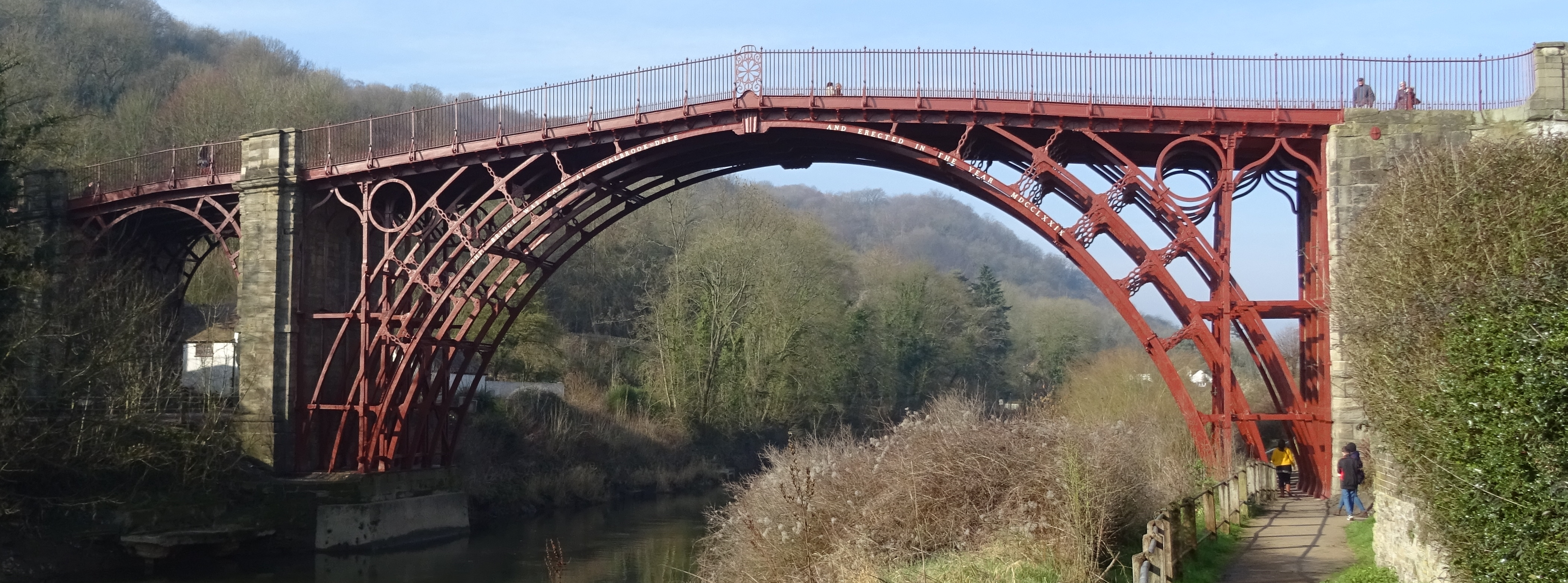
red-brown is the colour of the bridge since restoration (image taken 2019).

Between 1999 and 2000, the bridge was scaffolded to allow examination by English Heritage. The bridge was also repainted and minor repairs were carried out. In January 2017 English Heritage announced a £1.2 million restoration project on the Iron Bridge, starting in September 2017, the "biggest ever conservation project" undertaken by English Heritage. The cost was quoted in 2018 at £3.6 million, with English Heritage describing it as "an ambitious conservation of its ribs and arches, its stonework and decking." The project was created after extensive surveys of the area revealed that the historic structure was under threat due to stresses in the ironwork dating from the original construction, ground movement over the centuries, and an earthquake in the 19th century. Apart from the structural restoration, the bridge was also reverted from blue-grey to its original red-brown colour after forensic analysis revealed this was how the bridge looked when it was first erected.

Structural damage to the bridge before its restoration

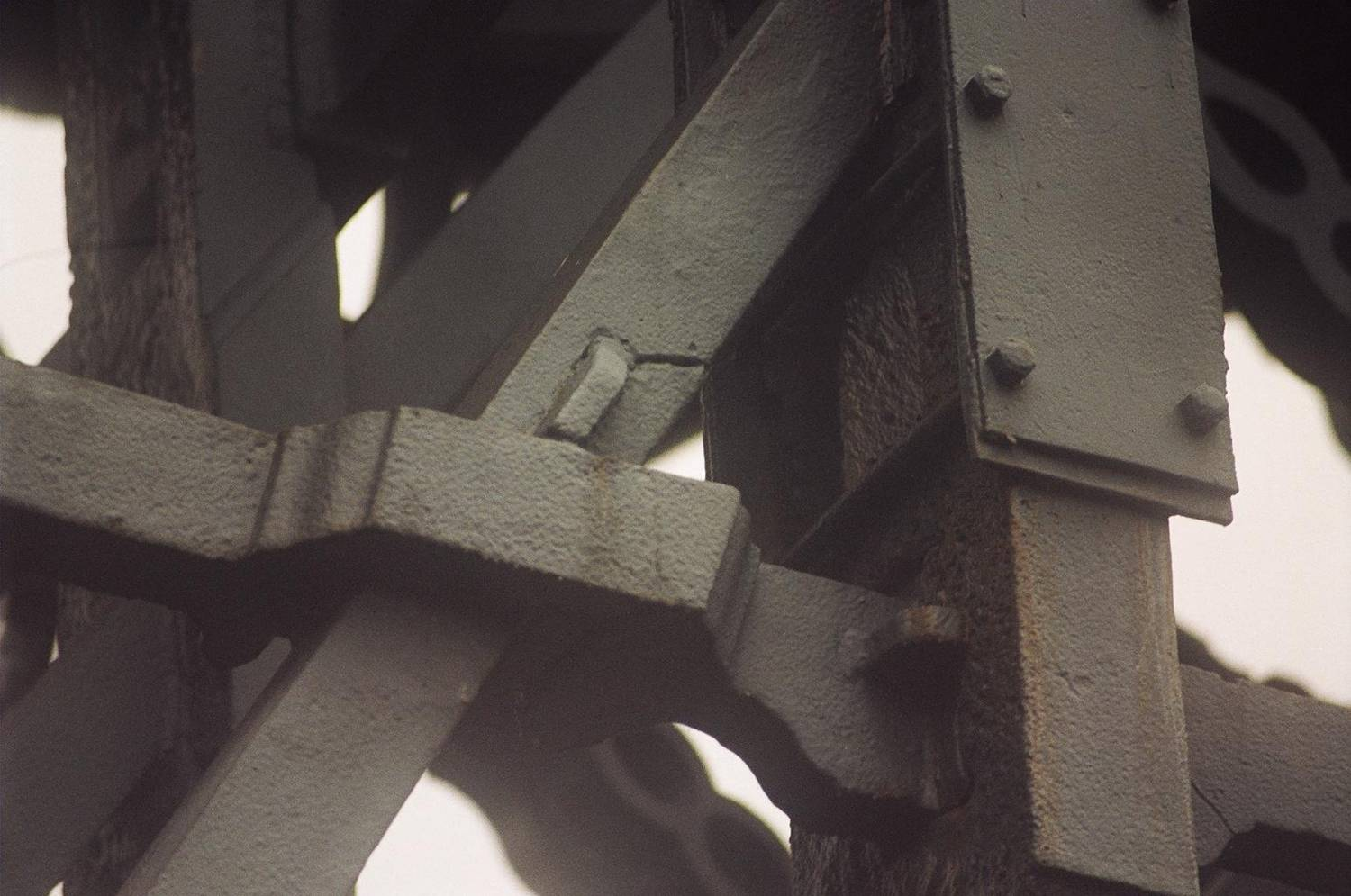
Cracked mortice joint
(image taken 2003)

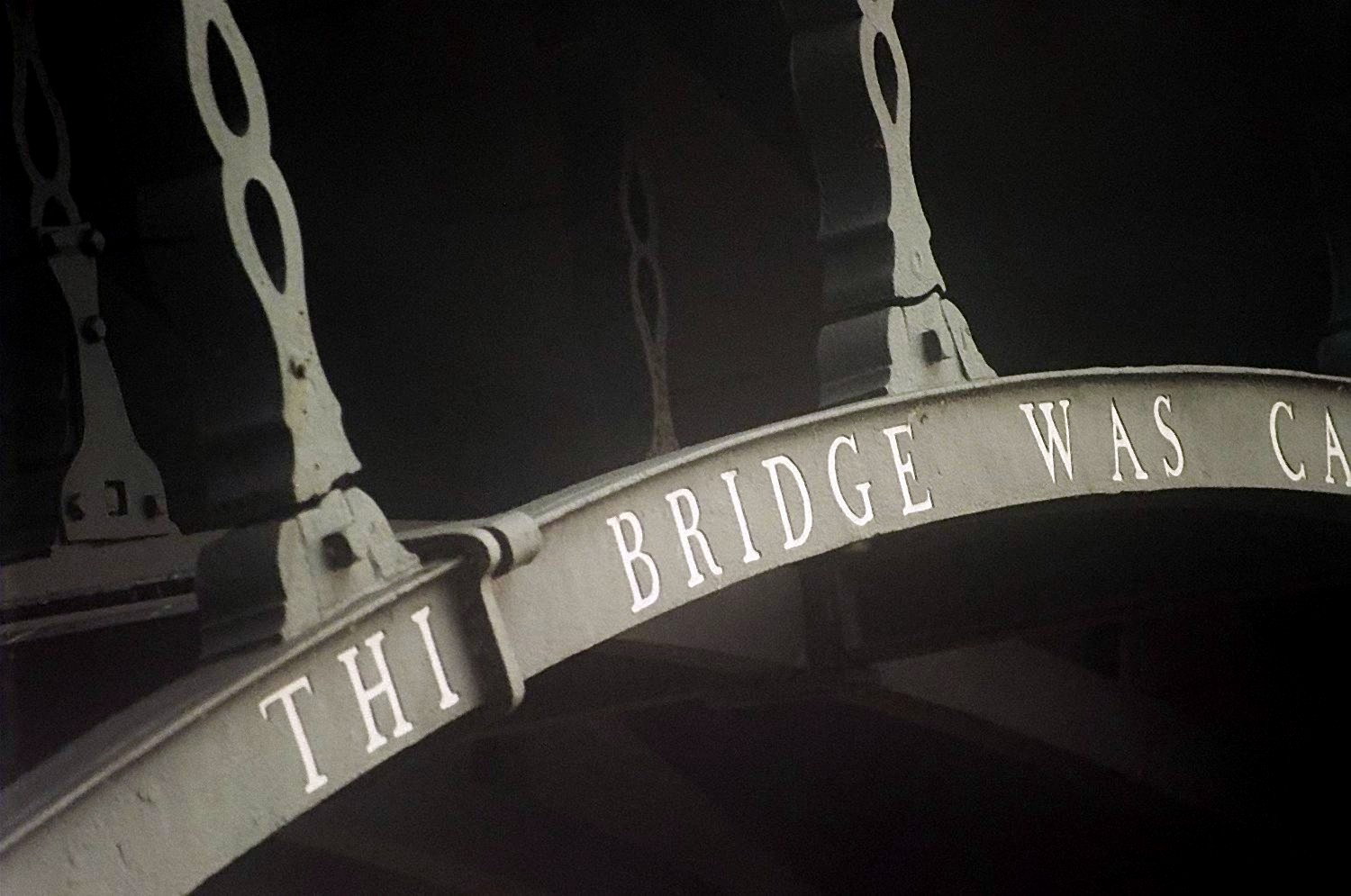
Broken supports
(image taken 2004)

The project was partly funded through the use of crowdfunding in which £47,545 was raised. It also received a €1,000,000 donation from the Hermann Reemtsma Foundation, a German foundation which mainly promotes cultural and social projects in northern Germany. This would also be the foundation's first funding in the United Kingdom. Following the works the bridge was reopened on 6 December 2018.

=== Recognition ===
The bridge, the adjacent settlement of Ironbridge and the Ironbridge Gorge form the UNESCO Ironbridge Gorge World Heritage Site, which was created in 1986. The bridge is a Grade I listed building, and is owned by Telford and Wrekin Council.

In 1934 it was designated a scheduled monument, and in 1979, the bridge was recognised by the American Society of Civil Engineers as an International Civil Engineering Landmark.

In 2020 the conservation and restoration work on the bridge was honoured in the European Heritage Awards/Europa Nostra Awards, which includes up to 30 of the most outstanding heritage projects from all parts of Europe within the EU and EEA.

== Influence on bridge design ==
The bridge, as the first bridge of significant size built of metal, had "considerable influence on developments in the fields of technology and architecture". The successful use of cast iron in 1781 pioneered the choice of that material for many subsequent bridges, and cast iron arches of considerable span were constructed late in the 18th and early in the 19th century.

- In 1786, the revolutionary author and polymath Thomas Paine had models built to demonstrate the use of cast iron for bridges, and promoted these to the Academy of Sciences at Paris, and to the Royal Society in England. He went on to have manufactured and erected "a complete rib of 90 feet span, and 5 feet of height from the chord line to the center of the arch", weighing three tons. This was followed by a complete bridge of five ribs and 210 feet (64 m) span which he had erected in a field in Paddington, but without buttresses it was merely for display and was dismantled after a year.
- In 1793–96, the Wearmouth Bridge was built with a span of 235 feet (72 m), constructed from cast iron in the form of cast voussoirs, somewhat like the voussoirs of a masonry bridge. The bridge used some of the iron from Paine's bridge, which had been returned to the foundry in Rotherham.
- In 1795, a large flood in the Severn swept away all the bridges in the vicinity, except the Iron Bridge, where the open structure allowed the floodwaters to pass through. Thomas Telford was Surveyor of Public Works in Shropshire at the time. His design for the replacement bridge at Buildwas incorporated a high arch like the Iron Bridge, but it had a span 30 feet (9.1 m) wider and used less than half the amount of iron. Telford went on to design a series of cast iron bridges, the oldest of which to survive is the Craigellachie Bridge.
- In 1799, the Coalport Bridge was rebuilt after the flood as a single span with three cast iron ribs. This 1799 version was re-modelled in 1818 with two additional ribs, and survives to the present day.
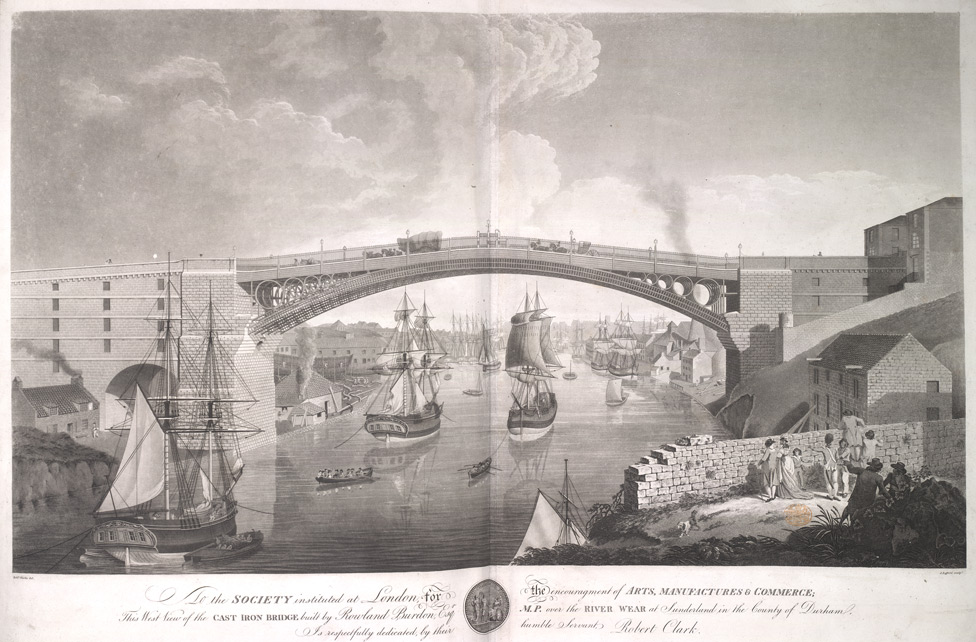
Wearmouth Bridge (1793–96)

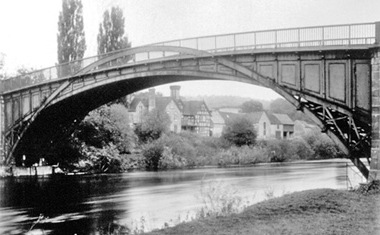
Buildwas Bridge by Thomas Telford (1795–96)

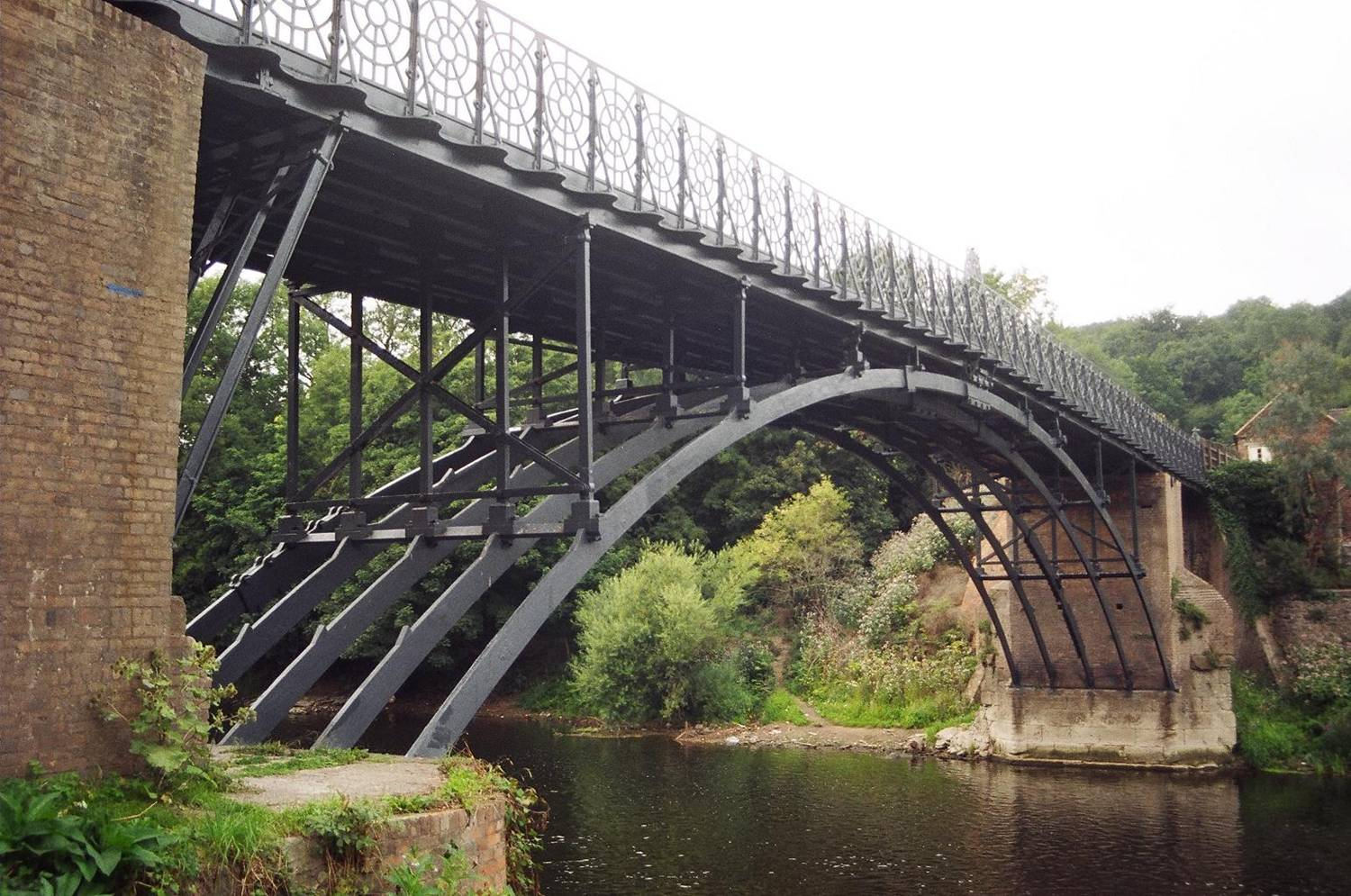
The Coalport Bridge (1818), incorporating three ribs from 1799 and an additional two in 1818

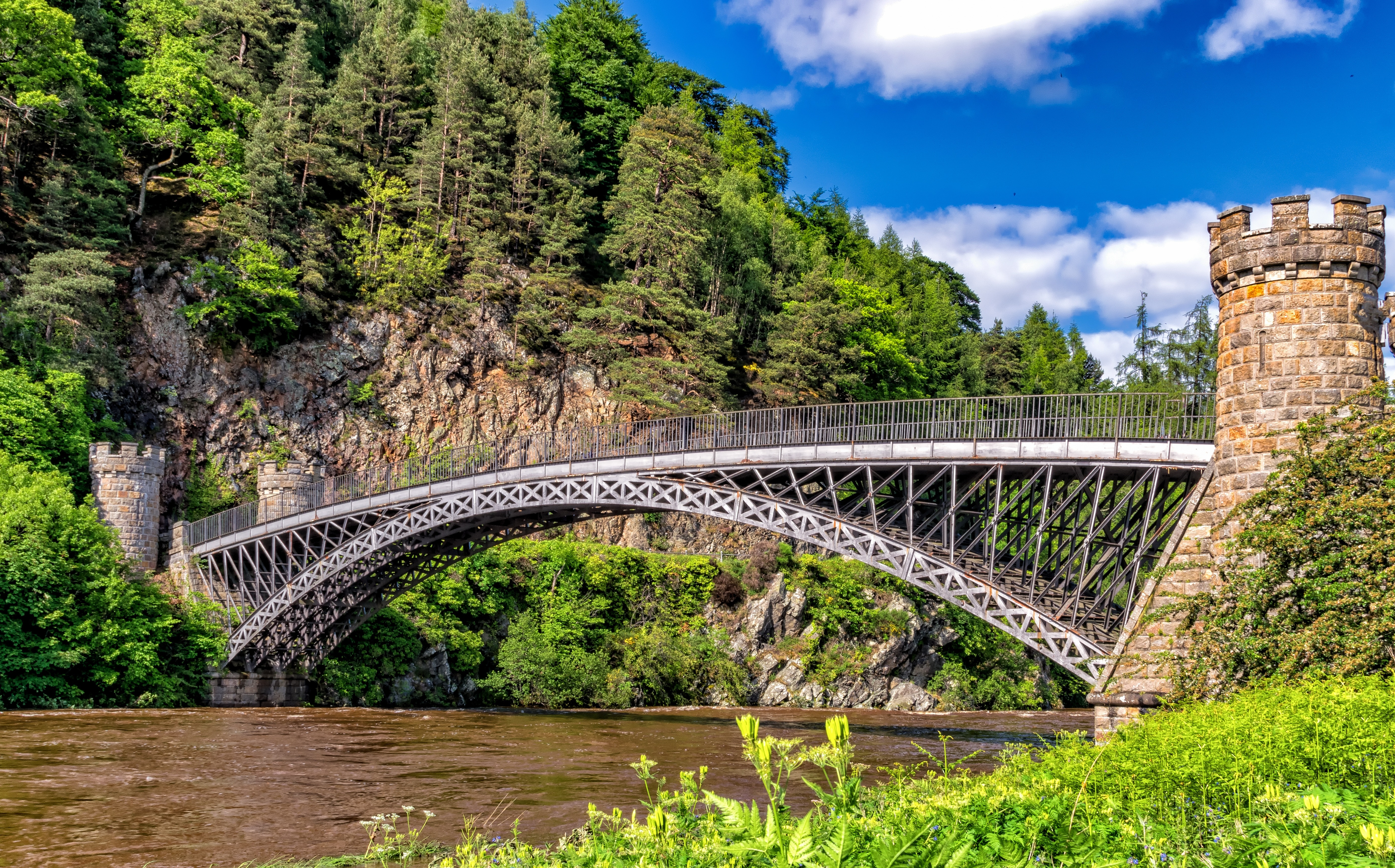
Craigellachie Bridge (1814) by Telford

== Artistic depictions ==
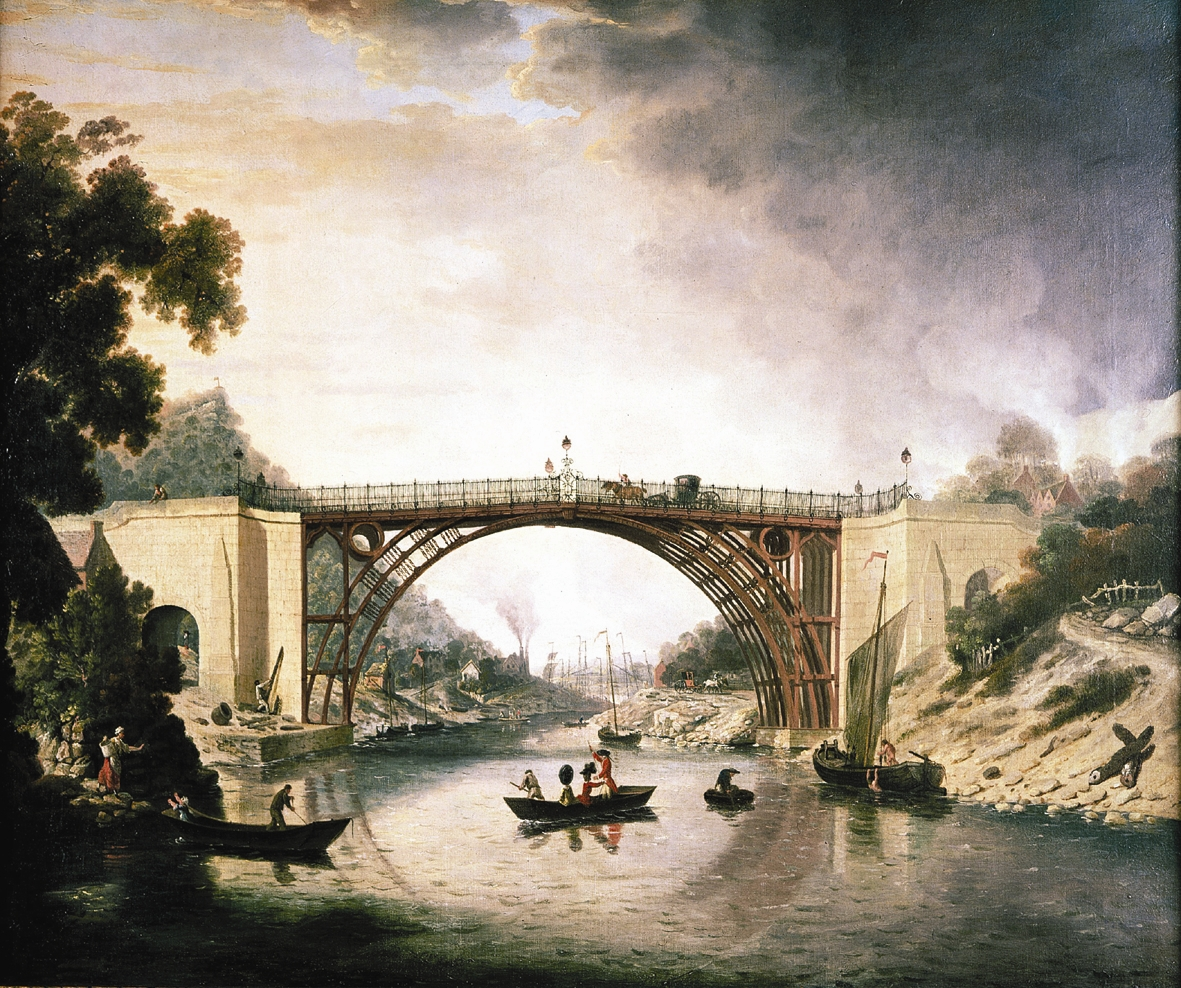
The original red-brown colour of the bridge can be seen in William Williams' 1780 painting, which was commissioned by Abraham Darby III.

Over fifty painters and engravers came to the area around Coalbrookdale between 1750 and 1830 to witness and record the rise of industry and changing landscape. One of the first artists to depict the bridge was William Williams, who was paid 10 guineas (equivalent to £1,278 in 2016) in October 1780 by Darby for a drawing of the bridge. An engraving by Michael Angelo Rooker proved popular, and a copy was purchased by Thomas Jefferson where it was displayed in the dining room of Monticello.

In 1979, the Royal Academy of Arts held an exhibition entitled "A View from the Iron Bridge" to commemorate the bicentenary of the bridge.

== See also ==
- List of crossings of the River Severn
- Listed buildings in The Gorge
