= Ketley Canal =

Canal in Shropshire, England

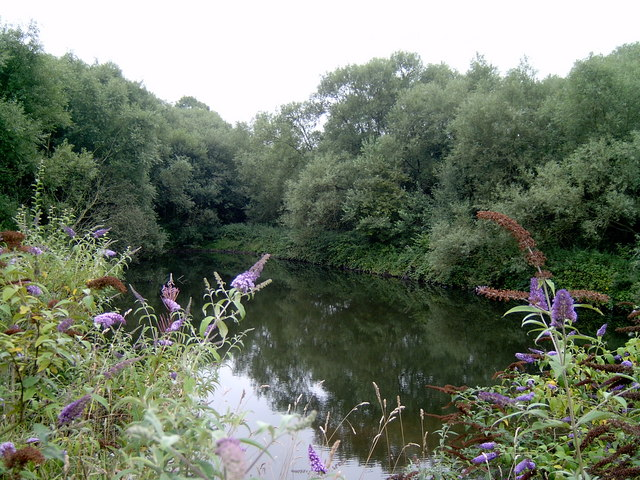
- A small part of the canal in Paddock Mount, Ketley still holds water

Specifications
- Locks: 1 + 1 inclined plane
- Status: mostly destroyed

History
- Principal engineer: William Reynolds
- Date of act: Privately built
- Date of first use: 1788
- Date closed: 1880s

Geography
- Connects to: Shropshire Canal

The Ketley Canal was a tub boat canal that ran for about 1.5 miles (2.4 km) from Oakengates to Ketley works in Shropshire, England. The canal was built about 1788 and featured the first inclined plane in Britain. The main cargo of the canal was coal and ironstone (a form of iron ore). The inclined ceased to be used in 1816, when Ketley Works was closed, but the upper canal was not finally abandoned until the 1880s. A few traces of the canal are still visible in the landscape.

== History ==
The Ketley canal was constructed between 1787 and 1788 by William Reynolds of Ketley. Reynolds was born in 1758 at Bank House, Ketley, the son of the ironmaster and philanthropist Richard Reynolds. His father managed the works at Coalbrookdale from 1763 to 1768, following the death of Abraham Darby II and the coming of age of his son, Abraham Darby III. Reynolds served his apprenticeship while his father was manager, and it was a period of great innovation, including the first use of iron rails. He became the most innovative and able of the various Shropshire ironmasters, and met with several engineers who visited Coalbrookdale regularly, including Matthew Boulton, James Watt, John Wilkinson, Lord Dundonald and Thomas Telford. He was also friendly with a group of intellectuals, centred on Joseph Plymley. In 1786, he constructed the Coalport Tar Tunnel, originally intended as a low-level access to mines further to the north, but discontinued when the excavations reached a source of natural bitumen. In the following year, he built the Wombridge Canal. Reynolds and his father started work on the Ketley Canal in 1787, in order to transport ironstone and coal from Oakengates to their foundries at Ketley. It ran in a westerly direction from Oakengates, passing through a tunnel where Shepherds Lane crossed Red Lake Hill, and ended to the north of Ketley Hall. At this point there was a 73-foot (22.3 m) drop to his works.

The construction of locks to lower the level of the canal was out of the question, as the meagre water supply for the canal was pumped from the mines. The main supply was probably the 'Derbyshire' level, an underground drainage channel which ran from Ketley to Old Park. Transhipment of the loads to wagons would have involved extra work, and being an innovator, he decided to construct an inclined plane, down which the loaded tub boats would be lowered. A boat entered one of two locks at the top of the incline, from which the water was pumped into a storage reservoir, resulting in the tub boat resting in a cradle. The incline had two tracks, so that a loaded boat descending on one track was counterbalanced by an empty or lightly loaded boat ascending on the other. The ropes and chains used to secure the boats were connected to a single winding drum which was housed in a structure spanning the top of the incline. The manoeuvre was controlled by a windlass, acting as a brake, and a steam pumping engine was used to pump the water back into the canal. During the construction, between 200 and 300 men were working on the project. A contemporary report published in Rees's Cyclopædia mentions that sliderails were installed along the canal at some of the bends, which enabled a train of tub boats to be guided around the bends when pulled by a single horse. From the foot of the incline, the canal continued through a 60-yard (55 m) tunnel to reach the Warehouse Pool, where the works was situated.

The rails on the incline were of 'L' section, and made of cast iron, and the system worked well. In a letter to James Watt from 1789, Reynolds wrote that "Our Inclined Plane answers my most sanguine expectations ... we have already let down more than forty boats per day each carrying 8 tons – in average about thirty boats daily and have not yet had an accident." A system to carry boats on an inclined plane had only been tried once before in the United Kingdom, on Dukart's Canal in County Tyrone, Ireland, and had failed. Reynolds incline, however, continued to work for 28 years, until Ketley works closed in 1816. Having completed the canal, Reynolds, together with several others, went on to construct the Shropshire Canal, which connected to the Ketley canal at the Oakengates end. The water level on the new canal was 1 foot (0.3 m) higher than that of the Ketley Canal, and so a lock was constructed near the junction. The Shropshire Canal also used inclined planes, but Reynolds modified his design somewhat, replacing the lock chambers and gates at the top of the inclines with reverse slopes.

Although the incline was disused by 1818, after closure of the Ketley ironworks, the Ketley Canal still served a coal wharf near Ketley Hall in 1842, and was not finally abandoned until the 1880s.

Little is left of the canal today, although the incline itself can still be seen, and there are traces of the upper level where it passed near to Ketley Hall.

== Points of interest ==
Point	Coordinates (Links to map resources)	OS Grid Ref	Notes
Eastern end of remains in 1882	52.6922°N 2.4506°W	SJ696106	
Canal near Holy Trinity Church	52.6918°N 2.4542°W	SJ694105	
North of Rose & Crown PH	52.6943°N 2.4615°W	SJ689108	
Holyhead Road Bridge	52.6944°N 2.4691°W	SJ683108	
Sherperds Lane Bridge	52.6950°N 2.4719°W	SJ682109	
Canal bed in water	52.6948°N 2.4740°W	SJ680108	
Basin north of Ketley Hall	52.6945°N 2.4759°W	SJ679108	
Approx head of incline	52.6931°N 2.4763°W	SJ679107	
Marked as "Water level"	52.6932°N 2.4856°W	SJ672107	

The points of interest represent the furthest extent of the canal that can be traced on the 1882 Ordnance Survey map. At the eastern end, the canal had already been obliterated by a number of railway tracks. At its western end, the remains terminate above Ketley Hall, but the final two points are based on a map in Williams.

== See also ==
- Canals of the United Kingdom
- History of the British canal system

== Bibliography ==
- Baugh, G C; Elrington, C R, eds. (1985). "Ketley". A history of the County of Shropshire. Victoria County History. Vol. 11: Telford. British History Online. ISBN 978-0-19-722763-3.
- Hadfield, Charles (1985). The Canals of the West Midlands. David and Charles. ISBN 978-0-7153-8644-6.
- Morriss, Richard K (1991). Canals of Shropshire. Shropshire Books. ISBN 978-0-903802-47-5.
- Russell, Ronald (1971). Lost canals of England and Wales. David and Charles. ISBN 978-0-7153-5417-9.
- Skempton, Sir Alec; et al. (2002). A Biographical Dictionary of Civil Engineers in Great Britain and Ireland: Vol 1: 1500 to 1830. Thomas Telford. ISBN 978-0-7277-2939-2.
- Williams, W Howard (1980). Shropshire Canals (A collection of articles). Shropshire Libraries. ISBN 978-0-903802-11-6.
