= Ketley =

Village in Shropshire, England

Coordinates: 52.69480°N 2.48084°W

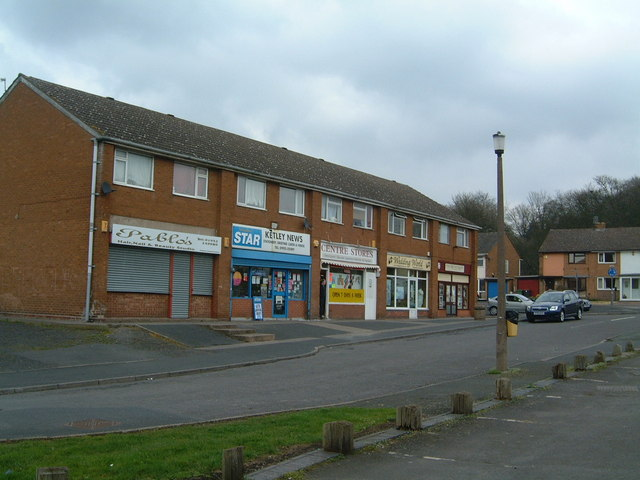
- Ketley

- Location within Shropshire
- OS grid reference: SJ676109
- Unitary authority: Telford and Wrekin
- Ceremonial county: Shropshire
- Region: West Midlands
- Country: England
- Sovereign state: United Kingdom
- Post town: Telford
- Postcode district: TF1

Ketley is a large village and civil parish in the borough of Telford and Wrekin of Shropshire, England. It is located between the outlying towns of Oakengates, Telford and Wellington.

== Residential development ==
East Ketley is currently being re-developed as part of the Telford Millennium Community, part of the Millennium Communities Programme. It will consist of around 750 new homes and some live/work units, a new primary school, some small offices and retail and leisure services in a masterplan designed by Lifschutz Davidson Sandilands.

The site originally consisted of just a small terrace of Victorian houses amid old mineshafts, colliery spoil, a golf course (which was later used as a driving range) and playing fields. Most of the site has been left fallow for many years and some areas have become locally important habitats for wildlife.

== Industrial development ==
Ketley was formerly the home of Ketley Ironworks. William Reynolds (the ironmaster of the works in the late 18th century) undertook the construction of three tub boat canals: the Wombridge Canal, the Ketley Canal and the Shropshire Canal with the first successful inclined planes in Great Britain. He lived at Ketley Hall, a grade II listed building which has now been converted into three separate dwellings. A small stretch of the Ketley Canal still survives and can be seen within Ketley Paddock Mound, a nature reserve and former colliery spoil tip.

The Shropshire Star was published in Ketley until July 2022, when the company moved to an office in Stafford Park.

== Notable people ==
- William Reynolds (1758-1803), born at Ketley Bank House, ironmaster.
- Samuel Parkes Cadman (1864-1936), born at Ketley, later an American Christian radio broadcaster.
- Kuldip Singh Sahota, Baron Sahota (born 1951), Labour local politician, lives in Ketley.

== See also ==
- Listed buildings in Ketley
