= Tar Tunnel =

Tunnel containing a natural bitumen spring at Coalport, England

Coordinates: 52°37′12″N 2°27′9″W

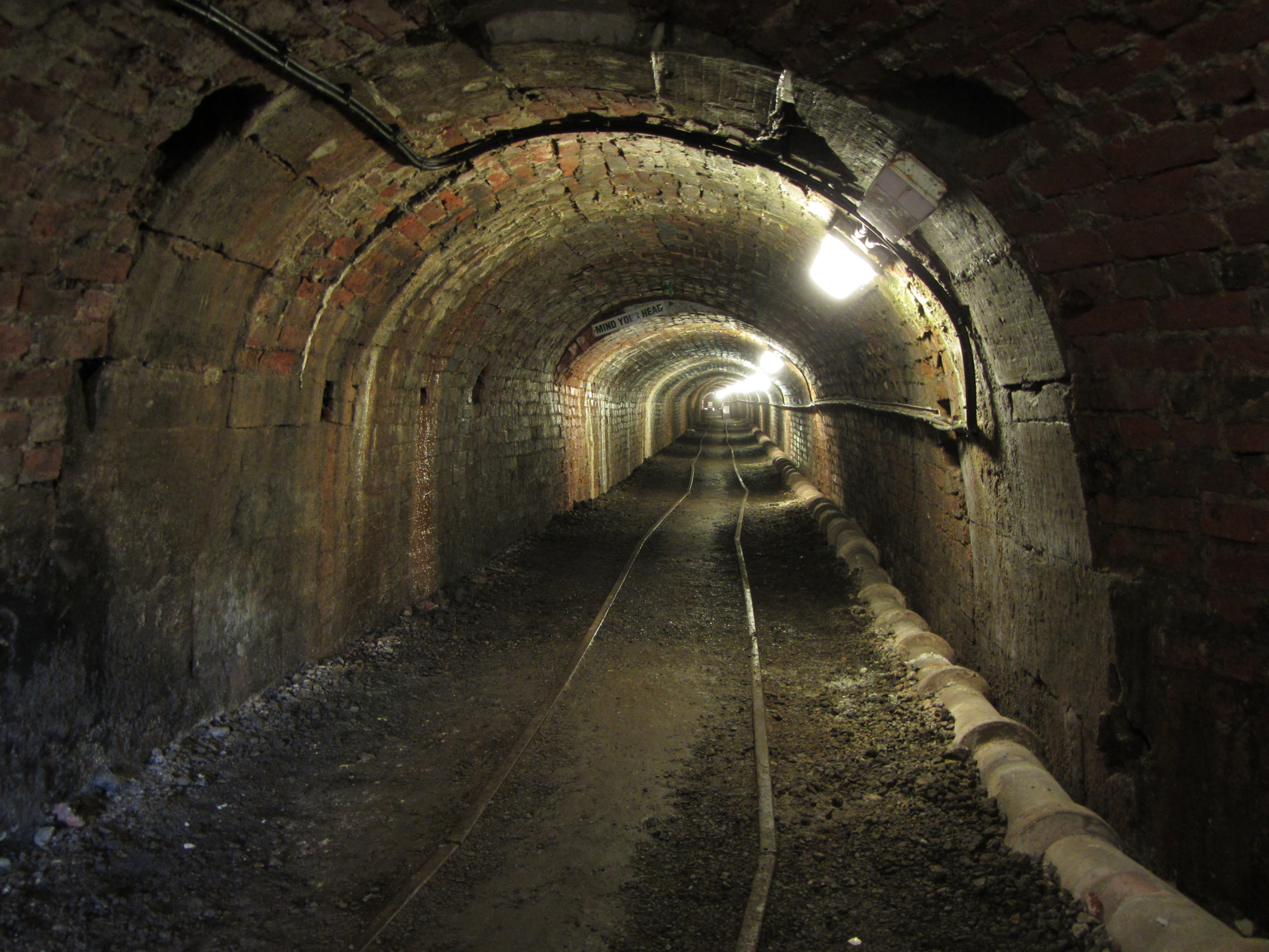
Inside the Tar Tunnel

The Tar Tunnel is an abandoned tunnel located on the north bank of the River Severn in the Ironbridge Gorge at Coalport, England. It is managed by the National Trust and is one of ten museums acquired from the Ironbridge Gorge Museum Trust in 2026.

== History ==
Miners struck a gushing spring of natural bitumen, a black treacle-like substance, when digging a canal tunnel for the Coalport Canal in 1787, or else digging a level in search of coal. The plan, proposed by William Reynolds, was to connect the canal alongside the River Severn to the lower galleries of the mines below the Blists Hill area. After digging around 3,000 feet (910 m) into the hill the canal project was abandoned in favour of bitumen extraction. A wagonway was constructed in the tunnel to remove coal from the mines in before or during 1796.

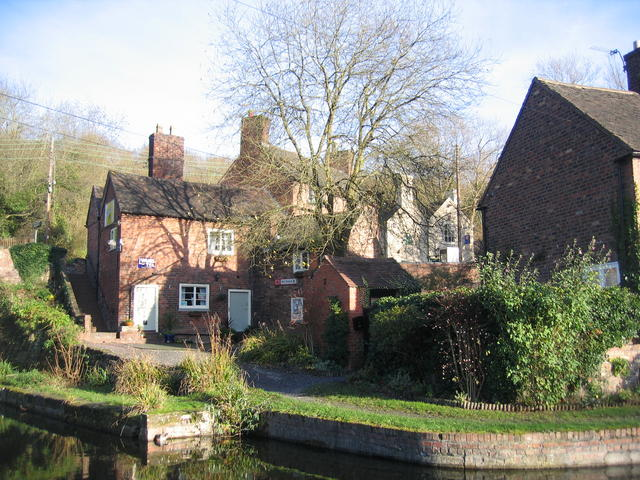
The doorway house to the Tunnel

The tunnel was a great curiosity in the eighteenth century and bitumen still oozes gently from the brick walls today. Bitumen's chief commercial use at the time was to treat and weatherproof ropes and caulk wooden ships, but small amounts were processed and bottled as "Betton's British Oil", a panacea remedy for rheumatism and scurvy. After the canal project was abandoned the Hay Inclined Plane was built instead, its base being alongside the canal basin.

Commercial use of the tunnel ended in 1941 after which is saw some use as a air raid shelter before complete abandonment.

In 1965 members of the Shropshire Mining Club entered the tunnel and were able to access the first 640 meters of it. The tunnel was bought by Dawley District council in 1967. During the following two years work was done to make the first 90 meters accessible to visitors. A further 185 meters were cleared by the coal board in 1974.

In the past visitors were provided with hard hats and were able to enter the first 300 feet (91 m) of the brick-lined tunnel as far as an iron gate. Electric lighting is provided. Due to a build up of gas in the tunnel, it is unsafe to enter but visitors could still get a view along part of its length from the entrance. although the museum has so far never reopened since the acquisition by the National Trust in 2026.

== Structure ==
The tunnel is around 1km long. The first 18 meters of the tunnel have a double layer of brick lining with single brick lining continuing out to 300 meters. There is then a 420 meter long unlined section after which the tunnel narrows to around 0.9 meters diameter and the brick lining returns. A secondary tunnel leaves the main bore at 361 meters.
