= Hay Inclined Plane =

Canal inclined plane in the Ironbridge Gorge in Shropshire, England

Coordinates: 52.6212°N 2.4525°W

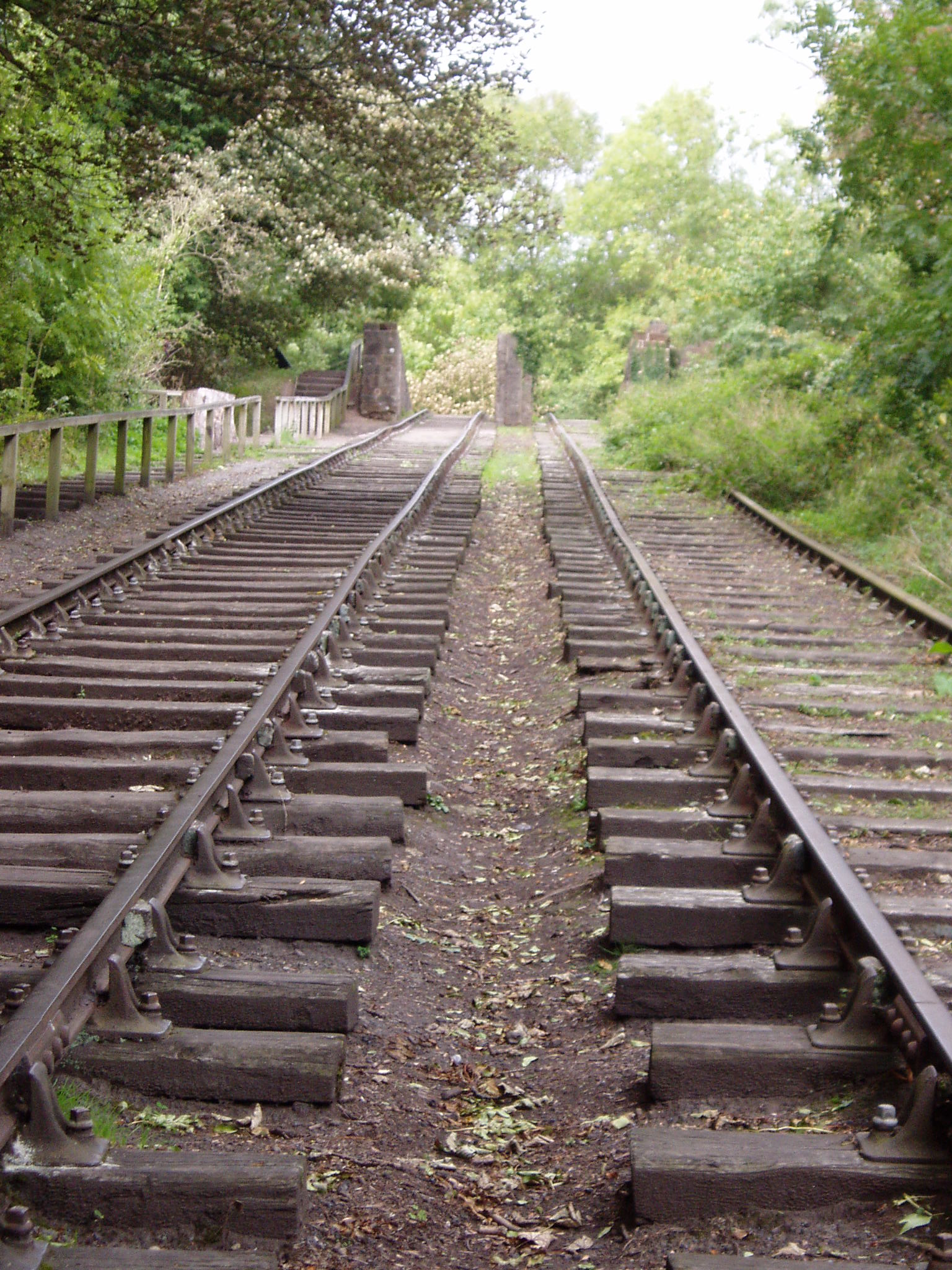
The Hay Inclined Plane

Hay Inclined Plane shown within Shropshire
(grid reference SJ694027)

The Hay Inclined Plane is a canal inclined plane in the Ironbridge Gorge in Shropshire, with a height of 207 feet (63 m). It was located at the end of the Shropshire Canal, part of a network of canals that linked the industrial region of east Shropshire with the River Severn. The inclined plane was in operation from 1793 to 1894. It can be visited as part of the Blists Hill Victorian Town and is also a waypoint on the South Telford Heritage Trail.

== History ==
The proprietors of the Shropshire Canal held a competition in 1788 to find the best means of raising and lowering heavy weights between the canal and the river Severn. They selected a design by Henry Williams and James Loudon, which was also used at a number of other inclined planes in east Shropshire. Construction of the Hay inclined plane was completed in 1793. By 1820 it was in poor condition and substantial repairs were needed. Further repairs were also carried out in the 1840s.

In 1857 the Hay inclined plane was taken over by the London and North Western Railway. The following year the LNWR closed the Shropshire canal between the Wrockwardine Wood and Windmill inclined planes, leaving only a short section of canal to serve the industrial area of Blists Hill. In 1861 they opened the Coalport branch line from Wellington to Coalport which passed underneath the Hay inclined plane near Coalport.

The last recorded use of the Hay inclined plane was thought to be in 1894 and it was formally closed in 1907. It was restored in 1968 and again in 1975, including the reinstatement of rails, as part of the creation of the Ironbridge Gorge Museums.

== Operation ==
The Shropshire Canal used box-shaped tub boats 20 feet (6.1 m) long with a load capacity of 5 tons. Twin railway tracks were laid down the incline. The tub boats ascended and descended the inclined plane on wheeled cradles which ran on the rails. At the bottom of the incline the rails went underwater allowing the cradle to become submerged and the tub boat to either float free or be floated into position. At the top of the incline the rails also started under water then climbed a short slope out of the water to the top of the incline.

In operation an empty boat would be loaded into the bottom cradle and a full boat would be loaded into the top cradle. A rope would be attached to the loaded top cradle and it would be drawn out of the water to the top of the incline using a small winding drum driven by a steam engine. The main incline rope would then be attached to the cradle and the loaded boat would descend the incline, counterbalanced by an empty boat ascending on the other rail line. The speed would be controlled by a brake on the main winding drum. On reaching the summit a rope from the small winding drum would be attached to the cradle to control its descent into the upper basin.

Although the loaded boats were travelling downhill, and so the plane was mostly worked by gravity, a small steam engine was also provided and drove the winding drums. This was of Adam Heslop's design, a twin-cylindered rotative beam engine, to a design patented in 1790. The remains of the brick boiler house and winding mechanism may be seen at the top of the incline.

The system was worked by four men and took around four minutes to raise or lower a boat.

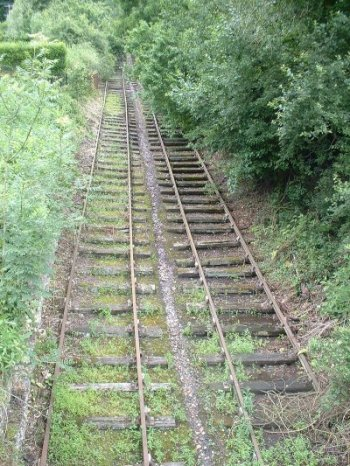

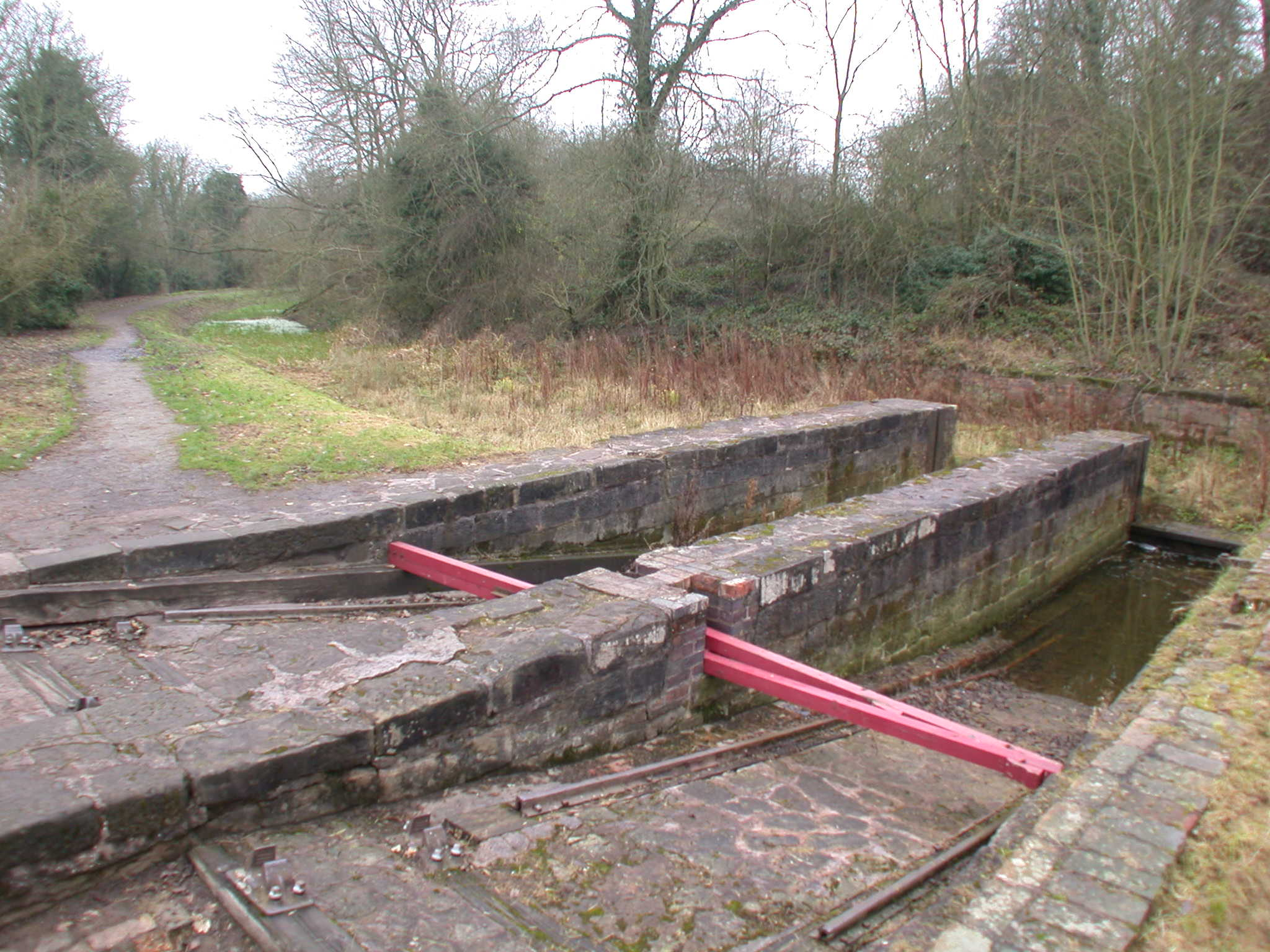
Top of the incline, showing original-pattern bridge rail. The normal water level is shown by the extent of the staining on the wall

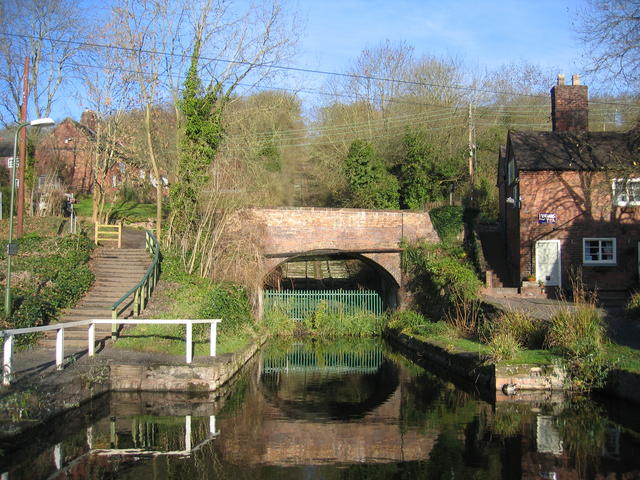
Coalport Canal at the bottom of the plane

== See also ==
- Coalport
  - Coalport Canal
- William Reynolds (industrialist)
- Canals of the United Kingdom
- Rivers of the United Kingdom
- History of the British canal system
- Listed buildings in The Gorge
