= Listed buildings in Ketley =

Ketley is a civil parish in the district of Telford and Wrekin, Shropshire, England. The parish contains two listed buildings that are recorded in the National Heritage List for England. Both of the listed buildings are designated at Grade II, the lowest of the three grades, which is applied to "buildings of national importance and special interest". The parish is a suburb of the town of Telford, and the listed buildings are a large house and a church.

== Buildings ==
Name and location	Photograph	Date	Notes
Ketley Hall; 52.69342°N 2.47638°W	—	18th century	The house was later extended. It is in brick with a dentil eaves course, a parapet with stone coping and a hipped tile roof. There are three storeys and three bays, and later flanking wings with two storeys and two bays. The windows are sashes; in the top floor of the central block they have segmental heads, and in the wings they have lintels with keyblocks.
St Mary's Church; 52.69149°N 2.47003°W		1838–39	The church, designed by James Trubshaw, is in sandstone with a slate roof. It consists of a nave, north and south transepts, a chancel and vestry, and a west tower. The tower has a doorway and bell openings in Norman style, a corbel table, and a pyramidal roof with a finial. The windows in the body of the church are lancets.
