= William Reynolds (industrialist) =

English ironmaster and scientist

William Reynolds (14 April 1758 – 3 June 1803) was an ironmaster and a partner in the ironworks in Coalbrookdale in Shropshire, England. He was interested in advances in science and industry, and invented the inclined plane for canals.

== Early life ==
He was born at Bank House in Ketley near Coalbrookdale, son of Richard Reynolds who was in charge of Abraham Darby II's ironworks at Ketley. Around 1777 he took over the management of the works there.

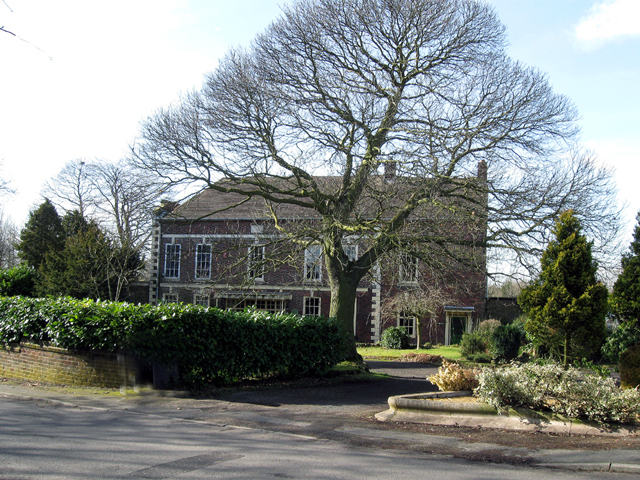
Bank House, Ketley Bank: formerly the home of William Reynolds

William Reynolds's education included some time studying with the physician and chemist Joseph Black. Reynolds during his life maintained his interest in many branches of science, including chemistry, geology and mineralogy, and he had a laboratory at his home Bank House, at Ketley Bank. He was interested in the application of science in industry. With Abraham Darby he built under licence several Boulton and Watt steam engines, an early type of steam engine, for the works.

== Innovations ==
Reynolds constructed three tub boat canals, which brought coal and iron ore a short distance from local mines to the ironworks. Built from 1787 to 1788, they were the Ketley Canal, the Wombridge Canal and the Shropshire Canal. They included an invention of Reynolds, an inclined plane: this was a method of raising canal boats from one level to another.

=== Visiting engineers ===
During this period, the reputation of Coalbrookdale encouraged visiting engineers who tried new ideas.

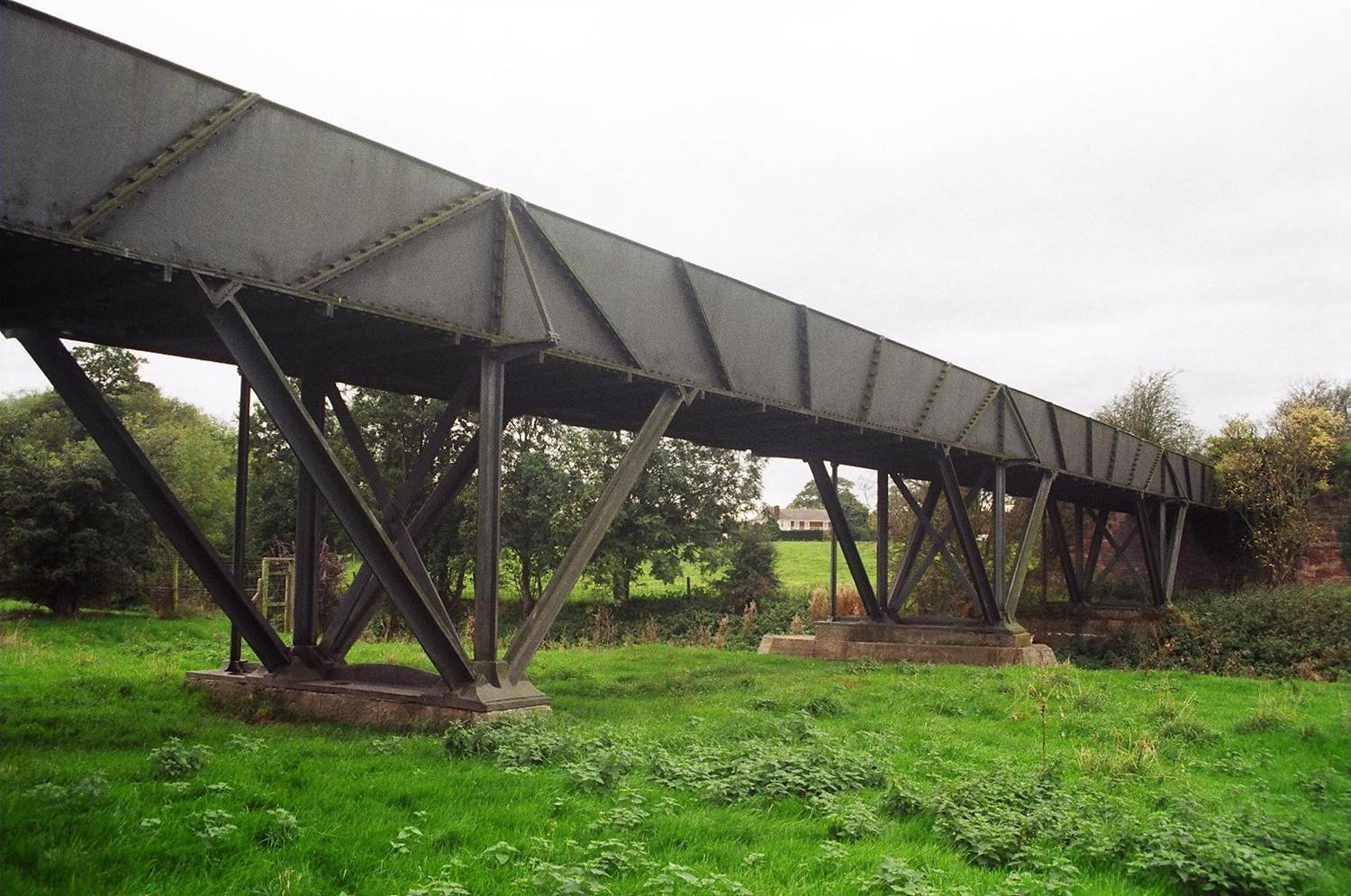
The cast-iron Longdon-on-Tern Aqueduct

Thomas Telford knew the Coalbrookdale company since he had become Surveyor of Public Works for Shropshire in 1787. Reynolds constructed Longdon-on-Tern Aqueduct for Telford, a cast-iron aqueduct, assembled in 1796, carrying the Shrewsbury Canal across the River Tern at Longdon-on-Tern. (Telford, encouraged by its success, used cast iron for the Pontcysyllte Aqueduct).

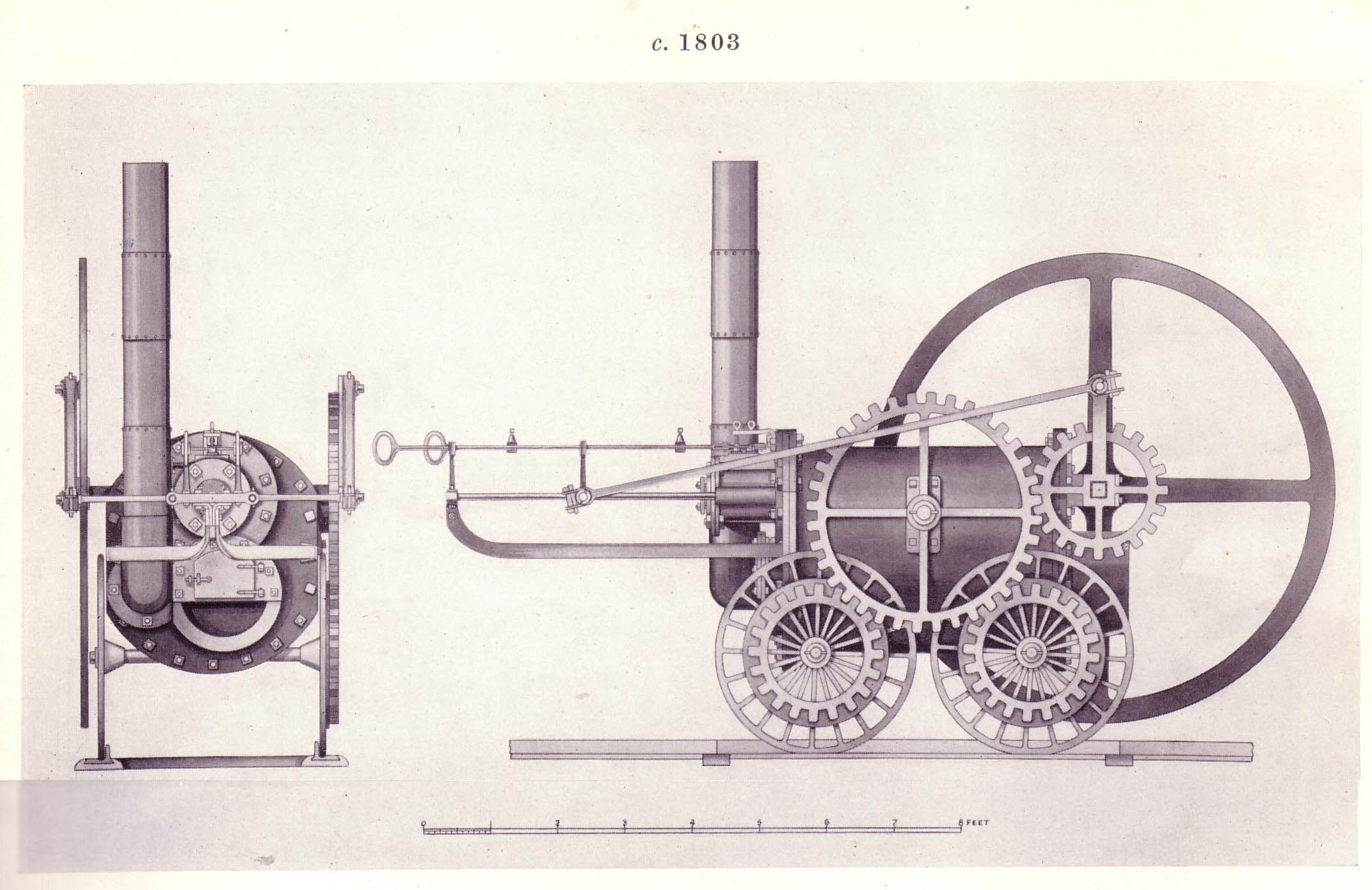
A drawing of the Coalbrookdale locomotive

In January 1802 Richard Trevithick came to Coalbrookdale, where boiler plates for steam engines had been made for some time. He built and tested a stationary engine which operated with an unprecedentedly high boiler pressure of 145 psi. Trevithick, who had built a road locomotive in Cornwall (the Puffing Devil), then worked, probably with Reynolds, to build a locomotive at Coalbrookdale that ran on rails; few details are known about this experiment, which is thought to be the first occasion of a locomotive on rails.

== Reynolds and Darby families ==
Around 1789 Richard Reynolds passed his shares in the Ketley ironworks to William and William's half-brother Joseph Reynolds (1768–1859). In 1796 the interests of the Darby and Reynolds families, having become complicated, were separated, the Ketley ironworks belonging to the Reynolds family, and Coalbrookdale to the Darbys.

Reynolds became seriously ill in March 1803, and died near Broseley (adjacent to Coalbrookdale) on 3 June of that year. He was buried in the Quaker burial ground at Coalbrookdale. His interests in the Ketley works were passed to his half-brother Joseph.

== See also ==
- Coalport
- Hay Inclined Plane
- Tar Tunnel
