= Coalport Bridge =

Bridge in Shropshire, England

Coordinates: 52.6157°N 2.4419°W

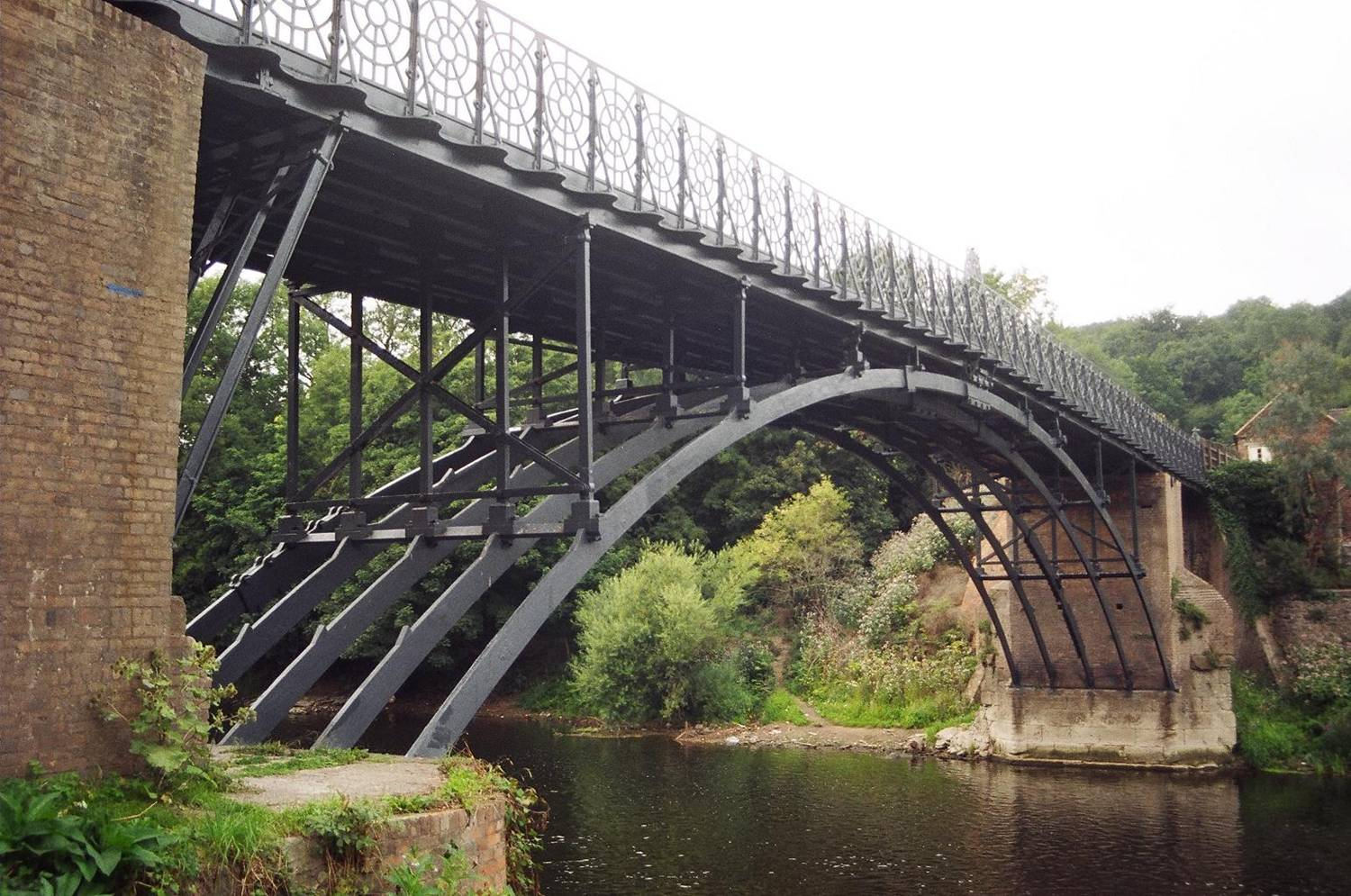
The Coalport Bridge

Coalport Bridge is a cast iron arch bridge between Coalport and Preens Eddy in Shropshire, England.

== Early bridge ==
Coalport Bridge over Severn (Tolls, etc.) Act 1776
- Act of Parliament
- Parliament of Great Britain
- Long title: An act for building a bridge across the river Severn, from or near a place called Preen's Eddy, in the parish of Broseley, to or near a place called The Sheep-wash, in the parish of Sutton Maddock, in the county of Salop; and for making proper roads and avenues to and from the same.
- Citation: 17 Geo. 3. c. 12
- Territorial extent: Great Britain

Dates
- Royal assent: 27 March 1777
- Commencement: 31 October 1776 (Note: Start of session.)
- Repealed: 23 May 1950

Other legislation
- Repealed by: Statute Law Revision Act 1950

Status: Repealed

Text of statute as originally enacted

Architect and bridge-builder William Hayward (1740–1782) designed the first crossing over the Severn at Coalport, based on two timber framed arches built on stone abutments and a pier. It was originally built by Robert Palmer, a local timber yard owner based in Madeley Wood, and opened in 1780. The bridge, known as Wood Bridge, connected the parish of Broseley on the south bank of the river with the Sheep Wash in the parish of Madeley and Sutton Maddock on the north bank. Its opening was somewhat played down as the impending showcase "Iron Bridge" further upstream was already being prepared as an icon by Abraham Darby III; the wooden bridge was short-lived and lasted less than 5 years until 1795, when severe winter flooding virtually washed away the mid-stream supporting pier.

== Cast iron bridge ==
After the destruction of 1795, the bridge remained closed until the Trustees of what was to become known as Coalport Bridge had it rebuilt in 1799 as a hybrid of wood, brick and cast-iron parts, cast by John Onions (Proprietor's Minute Book 1791–1827). The two original spans were removed and replaced by a single span of three cast iron ribs, which sprang from the original outer sandstone pier bases. The bridge deck was further supported by two square brick piers, the northern one constructed directly on top of the stone pier base and the southern one set back slightly towards the river bank. The remainder of the superstructure was built of wood and may have reused some of the original beams. However, by 1817, this bridge was failing again, attributed to the insufficient number of cast iron ribs proving inadequate for the volume of traffic. Consequently, the bridge proprietors decided to rebuild Coalport Bridge once again, this time completely in iron. The quality of the castings is good, especially by comparison with the castings of the Iron Bridge upstream. The bridge was renovated in 2005 with the static load lowered by replacing cast iron plates used for the roadway with composite carbon fibre/fibreglass plates, with substantial weight saving.

== Later history ==
The date of 1818 displayed on its midspan panel refers to this substantial work which allowed the bridge, subscribed to by Charles Guest, one of the principal trustees, to stand without major repairs for the next 187 years. John Onions and Guest's brother John were buried at Birch Meadow Baptist Chapel, Broseley, a chapel for which Guest had earlier paid half of the building costs. Some further strengthening work was carried out on the bridge in 2004-05 when it was closed for about a year to reconstruct the two brick arches supporting the verges at the south side of the bridge. It still takes vehicular traffic, unlike the more famous Iron Bridge, albeit limited to a single line of traffic, a 3-tonne weight limit and a height restriction of 6 ft 6in (1.98 cm).

It is also directly next to the former Coalport East railway station (Coalport Branch Line) on the Telford side of the bridge and is also a few metres down from the former Coalport West railway station (Severn Valley Railway), which could become a possible extension of the heritage line linking Coalport back onto a railway connection.
