= Ketley Ironworks =

Ketley Ironworks was an ironworks in Ketley, in Shropshire, England. Established in 1756, it was one of the largest ironworks in Britain during its ownership by William Reynolds and his brother Joseph.

The site's location is grid reference SJ 672 109 (52°41′43″N 2°29′10″W).

== History ==
Abraham Darby II and Thomas Goldney III leased land from Lord Gower in 1756; by 1758 there were two blast furnaces in operation on the site. In 1775 Richard Reynolds, a partner since 1757, bought Goldney's shares. In 1776 there were three furnaces, and in 1785 a forge began operation. In 1788 the Ketley Canal was completed; it brought coal and ironstone from Oakengates to the works.

In 1789 Richard Reynolds passed his share in the works to his sons William and Joseph, and in 1796 they became sole partners. There were six blast furnaces by 1804, and in 1806 about 7,500 tons of pig iron were produced, the ironworks being the fifth largest in Britain. The foundry made large castings for civil and mechanical engineers, the forge made plates and rods. The castings for Longdon-on-Tern Aqueduct, designed by Thomas Telford and built in 1795, were made at the works.

When William Reynolds died in 1803, Ketley Ironworks were valued at £110,000. His interests in the works were passed to Joseph. By 1816 demand had fallen, and he closed the works. The site was revived in 1818 by the newly created Ketley Company: the forge and three blast furnaces were again in use, and in 1830 about 5,750 tons of pig iron were produced.

The Ketley Company was dissolved about 1874, and the works closed. The site was sold to Nettlefolds Limited in 1879, but ironworking did not resume.

=== Later use of the site ===
The site was first used again in 1903, when the Sinclair Iron Co. Ltd. was established, making light castings. In 1929 it became a subsidiary of Allied Ironfounders Ltd. In 1960 Aga Heat, another subsidiary of Allied Ironfounders, moved to the site, and in 1969 the company became part of Glynwed Foundries Ltd.
