= Coalport =

Village in Shropshire, England

Coordinates: 52.618°N 2.449°W

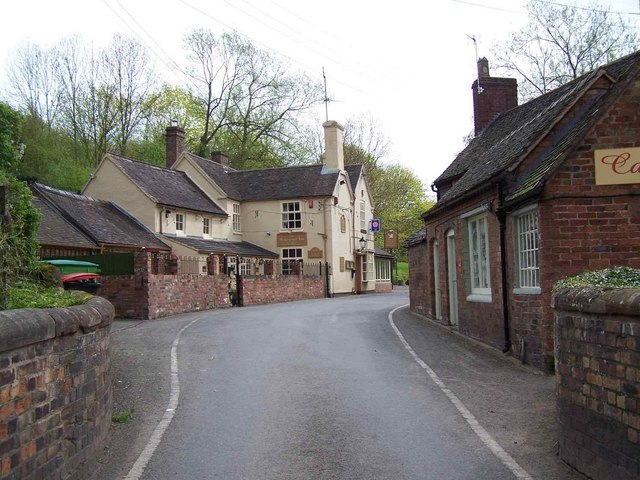
- The Shakespeare Inn in the village centre, where the road crosses the Hay Inclined Plane

- Location within Shropshire
- OS grid reference: SJ696023
- Civil parish: The Gorge
- Unitary authority: Telford and Wrekin
- Ceremonial county: Shropshire
- Region: West Midlands
- Country: England
- Sovereign state: United Kingdom
- Post town: TELFORD
- Postcode district: TF8
- Dialling code: 01952
- Police: West Mercia
- Fire: Shropshire
- Ambulance: West Midlands
- UK Parliament: Telford

Coalport is a village in Shropshire, England. It is located on the River Severn in the Ironbridge Gorge, a mile downstream of Ironbridge. It lies predominantly on the north bank of the river; on the other side is Jackfield. It forms part of the civil parish of the Gorge and is the south-eastern corner of the borough of Telford and Wrekin.

== History ==
The settlement was planned as a canal–river interchange by ironmaster William Reynolds, who built warehouses, workshops, factories and workers' accommodation in Coalport between 1788 and 1796. He also directed the construction of the Shropshire Canal, linking the East Shropshire Coalfield with the River Severn — the terminus being Coalport Wharf between the Brewery Inn and Coalport Bridge. Coalport was, at this time, much larger than it is today.

== Cast iron bridge ==
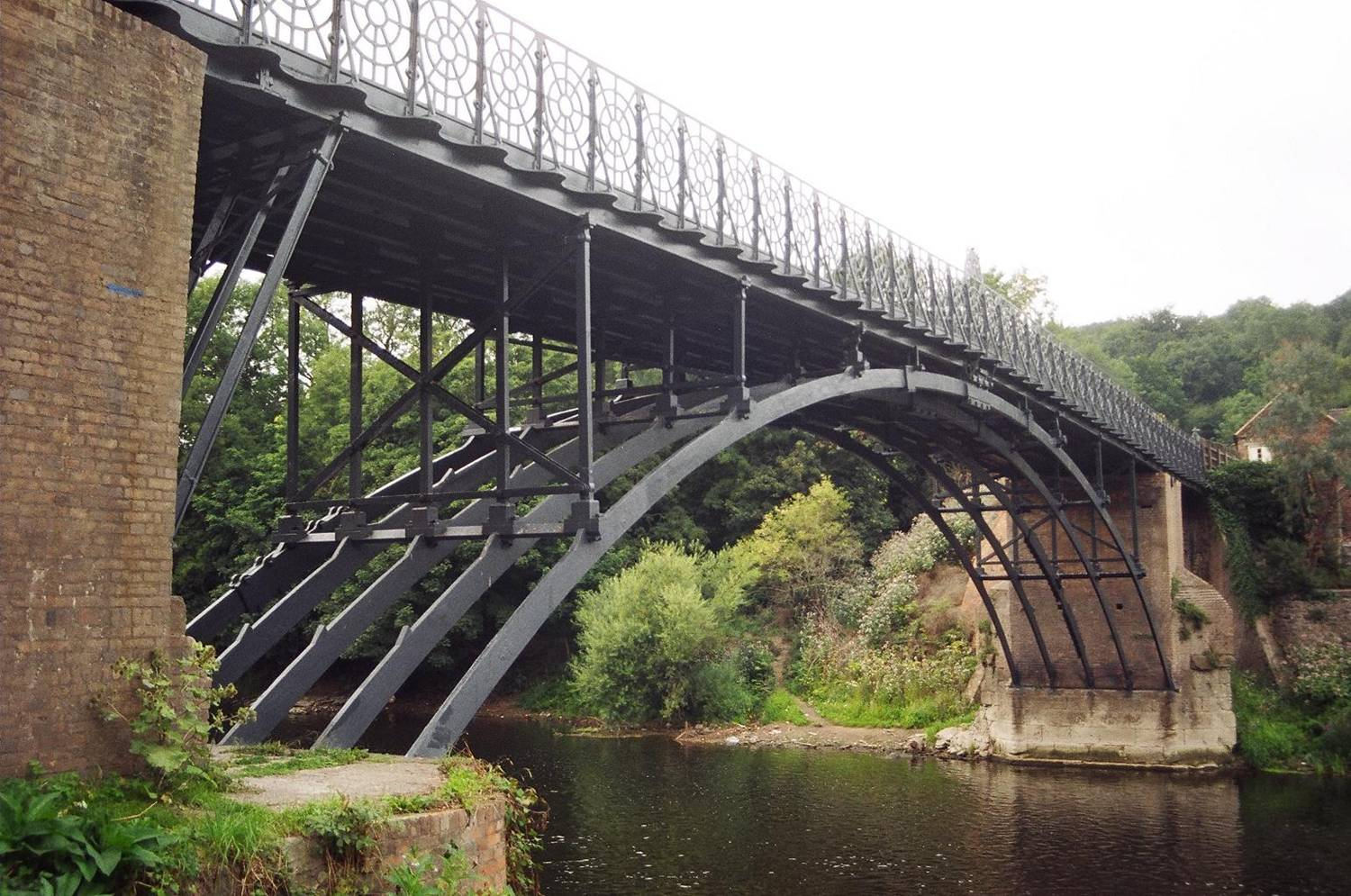
Coalport Bridge

The Coalport Bridge of cast iron was built in 1818 and unlike its even more famous neighbour at Ironbridge, still takes vehicular traffic, albeit limited to a single line of traffic, a 3-tonne weight limit and a height restriction of 6 ft 6in (1.98 m). It was restored and strengthened in 2004. The bridge links Coalport with Broseley, a town approximately a mile (1.6 km) away.

The bridge effectively extends Coalport across the river to an area historically known as Preens Eddy. On this southern side of the bridge is the Woodbridge Inn and the former Coalport West railway station. The Telford and Wrekin borough boundary runs through Preens Eddy - the Woodbridge Inn for instance lies in the Shropshire Council area.

== Pottery ==
Coalport was home to an important pottery founded in 1795 by John Rose. It produced Coalport porcelain which became popular worldwide. The building it was initially produced in is now a YHA youth hostel and café. Production later moved across the canal to the buildings which are now the Coalport China Museum. Production moved to Staffordshire in 1926, and, although the Coalport name was retained as a brand, the company subsequently became part of the world-famous Wedgwood group.

== Transport ==
=== Railways ===
The easternmost part of Coalport was, at one time, served by two railway stations:

- Coalport East was a terminus of a London and North Western Railway branch from Wellington; it is sited on the northern river bank.
- Coalport West was a through station on the Severn Valley Railway on the southern bank, operated by the Great Western Railway. The line is now part of the Severn Way waymarked walk; the station building is a private residence. Two converted ex-British Railways coaches have been placed between the platforms to provide holiday accommodation.

=== Canal ===
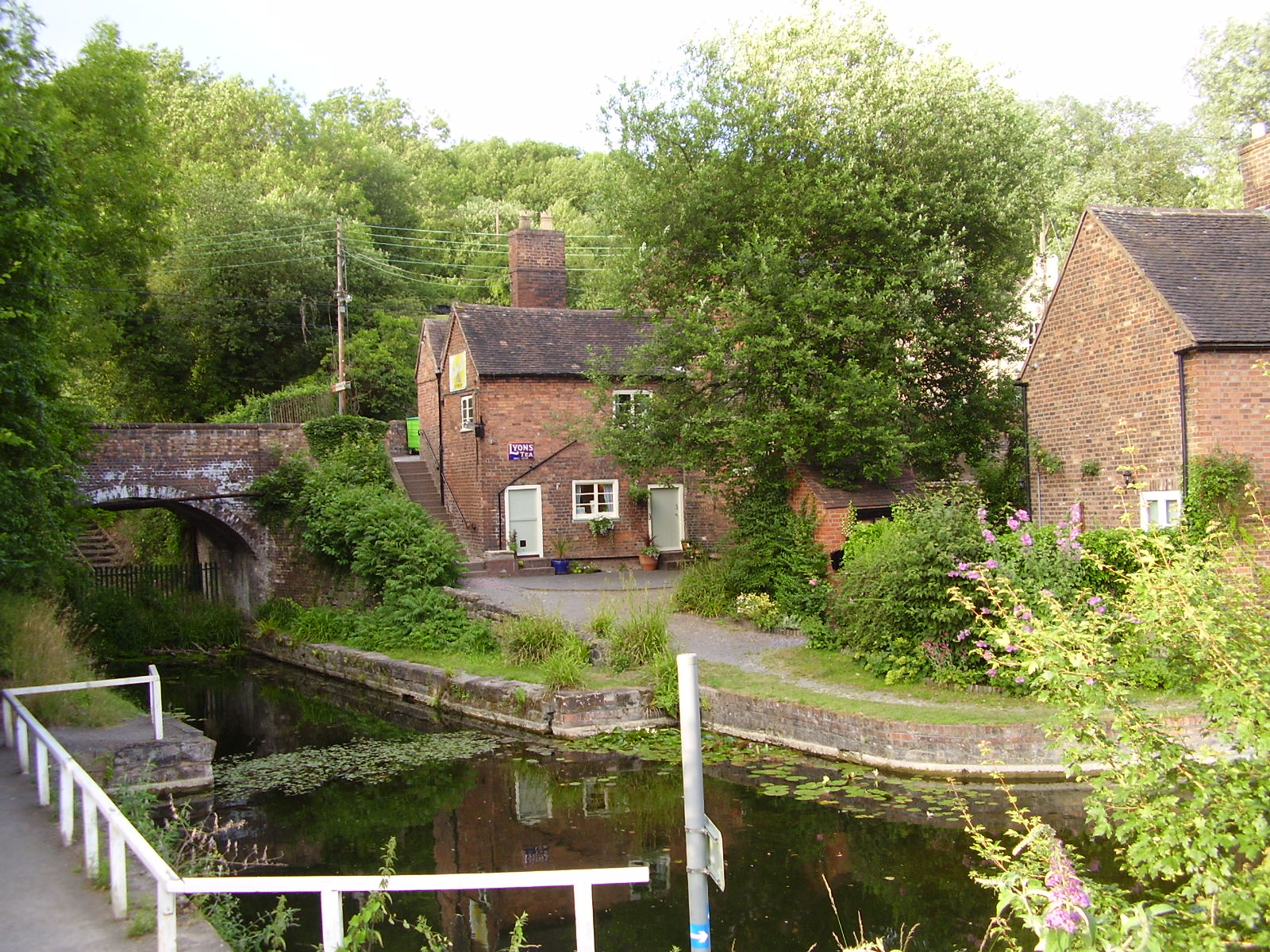
Coalport Canal with the house at the entrance to the Tar Tunnel

The Coalport Canal runs through the village and greatly aided the settlement's development. The Hay Inclined Plane was completed in 1793 and is one of the country's major industrial monuments and the best preserved and most spectacular of its kind. It enabled canal barges and narrowboats to be transferred from the bottom of the Severn gorge to the top, up a 1 in 4 gradient on wheeled cradles, operated by a team of just four men. It was the equivalent of 27 canal locks and could transport six barges per hour in this fashion, an operation that would have taken over three hours using a traditional lock system.

The canal was eventually superseded by rail transport and fell into neglect, silting up and becoming overgrown; it was infilled in the 1920s. It was not until the late 1970s that it was partially restored, with further restoration in the 1990s. The Hay Inclined Plane is now part of the Blists Hill museum, part of the Ironbridge Gorge Museum Trust that operates Blists Hill Victorian Town, just half a mile up the hill.

== Tar tunnel ==
The Tar Tunnel, a former source of natural bitumen, is near the Coalport Canal, and is open to the public at certain times.

== Memorial footbridge ==
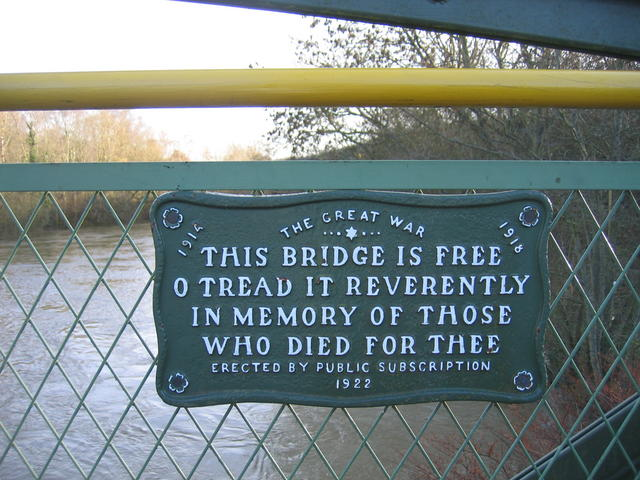
Plaque half-way along the footbridge, commemorating those who died in the Great War.

The Memorial Bridge is a footbridge spanning the River Severn, linking the Tuckies part of Jackfield with Coalport. It was built with funds raised by public subscription in 1922, and is in memorial to the men of Jackfield and Coalport who were killed in the First World War, later dedicated to those of both World Wars. The original structure was declared unsafe in 1997 but was refurbished and reopened in 2000.

== Pubs ==
There are four public houses open in Coalport — the Brewery Inn, the Shakespeare Inn, the Boat Inn and the Woodbridge Inn (on the southern bank, by Coalport Bridge).

== See also ==
- Industrial Revolution
- Ironbridge Gorge Museum Trust
- The Iron Bridge
- Listed buildings in The Gorge

== Bibliography ==
- Cossons, Neil; Trinder, Barrie (2002). The Iron Bridge: Symbol of the Industrial Revolution (2 ed.). Phillimore & Co Ltd.
- Cragg, Roger, ed. (1997). Civil Engineering Heritage: Wales and West England (2 ed.). Thomas Telford Ltd.
- Lewis, Peter R. (2007). Disaster on the Dee: Robert Stephenson's Nemesis of 1847. Tempus.
