= Canal inclined plane =

Cable railway for changing boat elevation

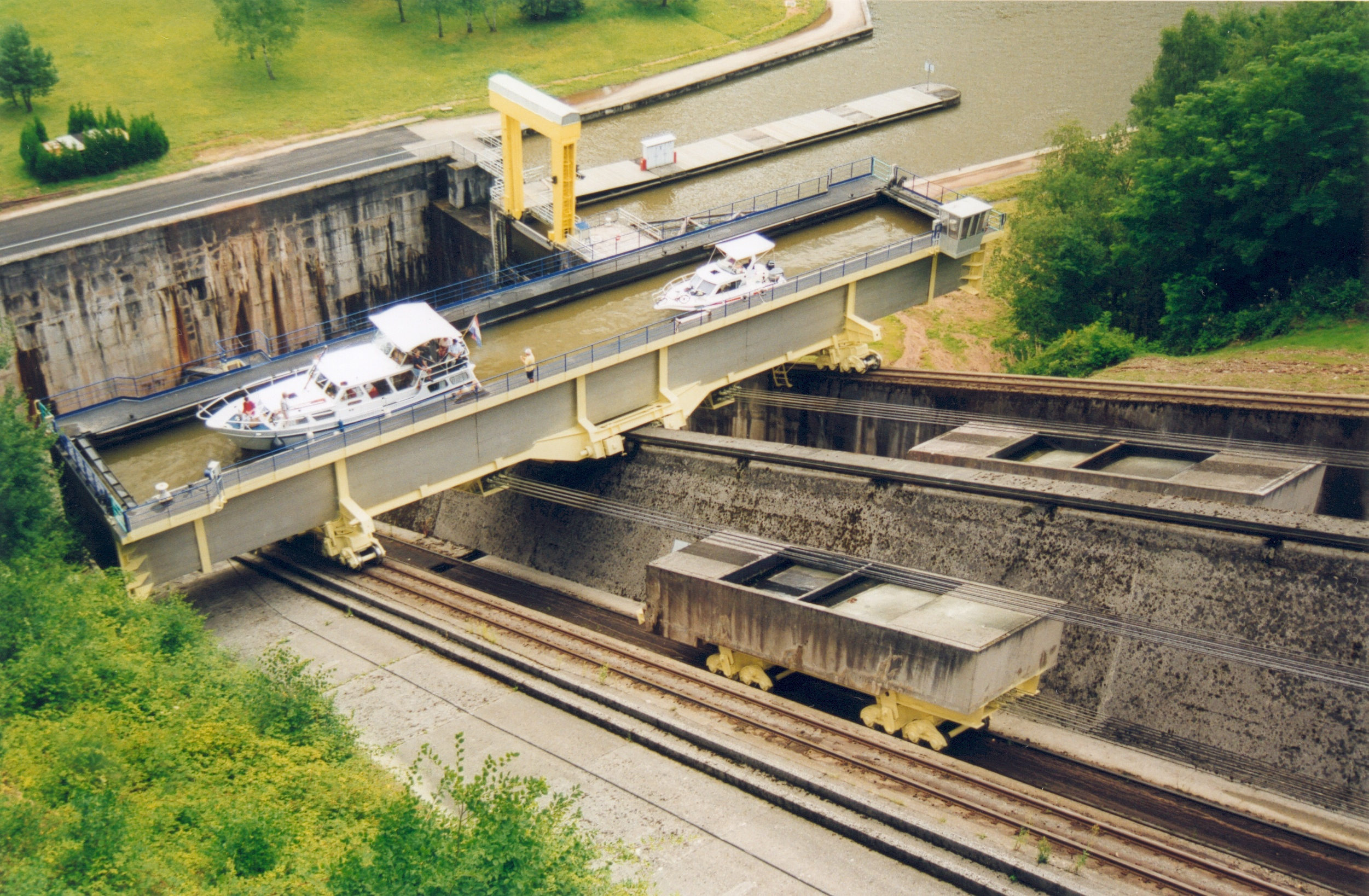
Inclined plane on Marne–Rhine Canal with one caisson (the second caisson was never added)

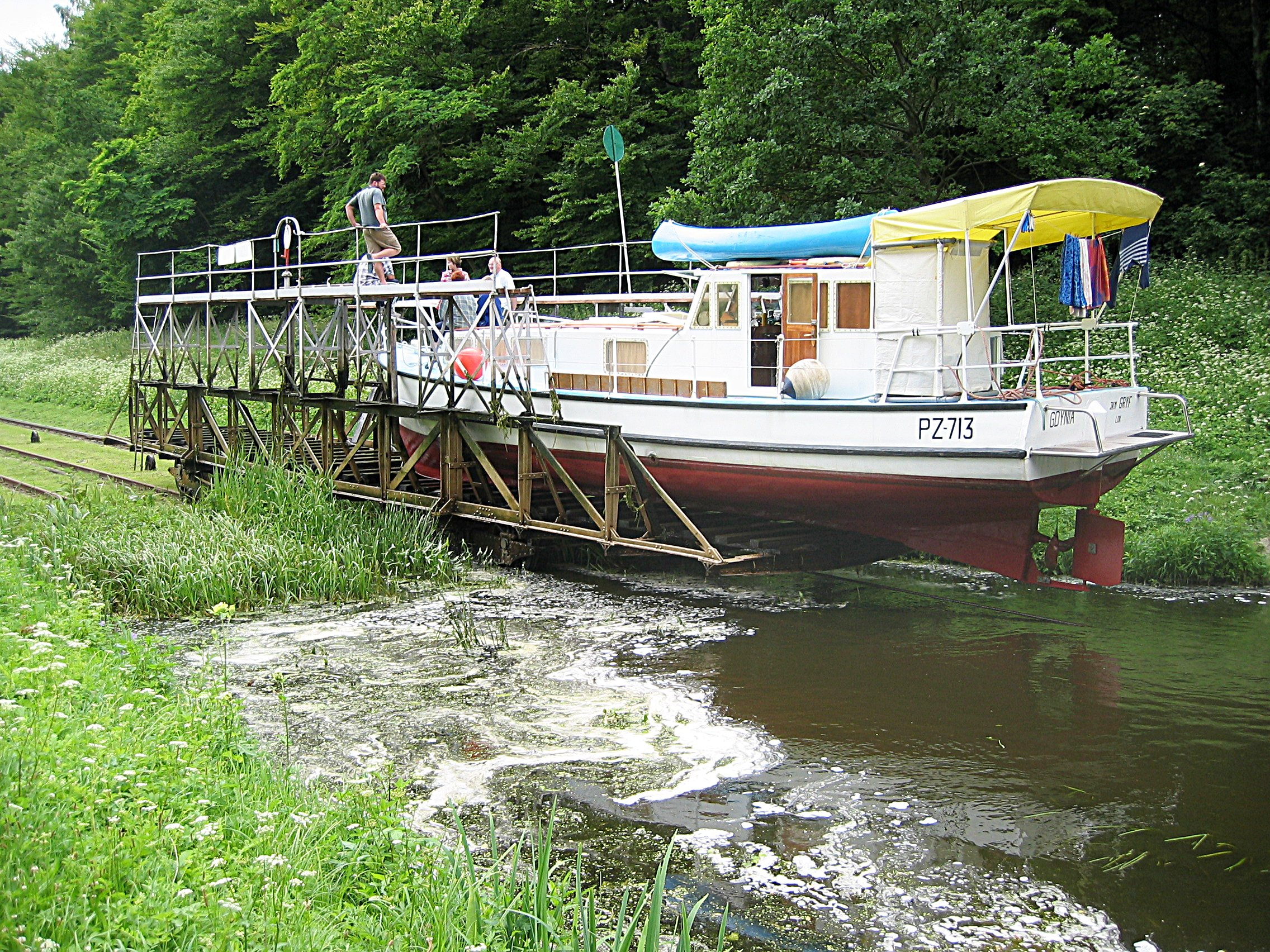
Inclined plane of the Elbląg Canal with a cradle

An inclined plane is a type of boat lift cable railway used on some canals for raising boats between different water levels. Boats may be conveyed afloat, in caissons, or may be carried in cradles or slings.

== History ==
Inclined planes have evolved over the centuries. Some of the first were used by the Egyptians to bypass waterfalls on the Nile. These consisted of wooden slides covered with silt which reduced friction.

=== Timeline ===
- 600BC – The Diolkos, an early Greek inclined plane, was in use.
- 385AD – Inclined planes were in use on the Grand Canal in China.
- 1167 – Nieuwedamme overtoom (a simple type of incline) was built at Ypres.
- 1568 – Wagon of Zafosina in use near Venice.
- 1777 – 3 inclined planes or 'dry wherries' began operation on Dukart's Canal, near Coalisland, in the south-east of County Tyrone in Ulster.
- 1788 – An inclined plane was built by William Reynolds and used, for the first time in England, to raise canal boats on England's Ketley Canal.
- 1792 – William Reynolds of Ketley Ironworks constructed several inclined planes on the Shropshire Canal.
- 1792–1921 – In 1792 the Shropshire Tub Canals were built incorporating a number of inclined planes. One of these, the Trench plane closed in 1921 and brought to an end boat-carrying inclined planes in Britain
- 1797–1822 – At Worsley Navigable Levels, a coal mine operation in Greater Manchester, England, an underground incline started in 1795 was completed in 1797.
- 1800 – Francis Henry Egerton (1756–1829), who became The 8th Earl of Bridgewater in 1823, wrote 'The Description of the Inclined Plane at Walkden Moor. (Lancashire)
- 1806–1828 Two inclined planes built on the Stollen Canal at Gliwice, Upper Silesia.

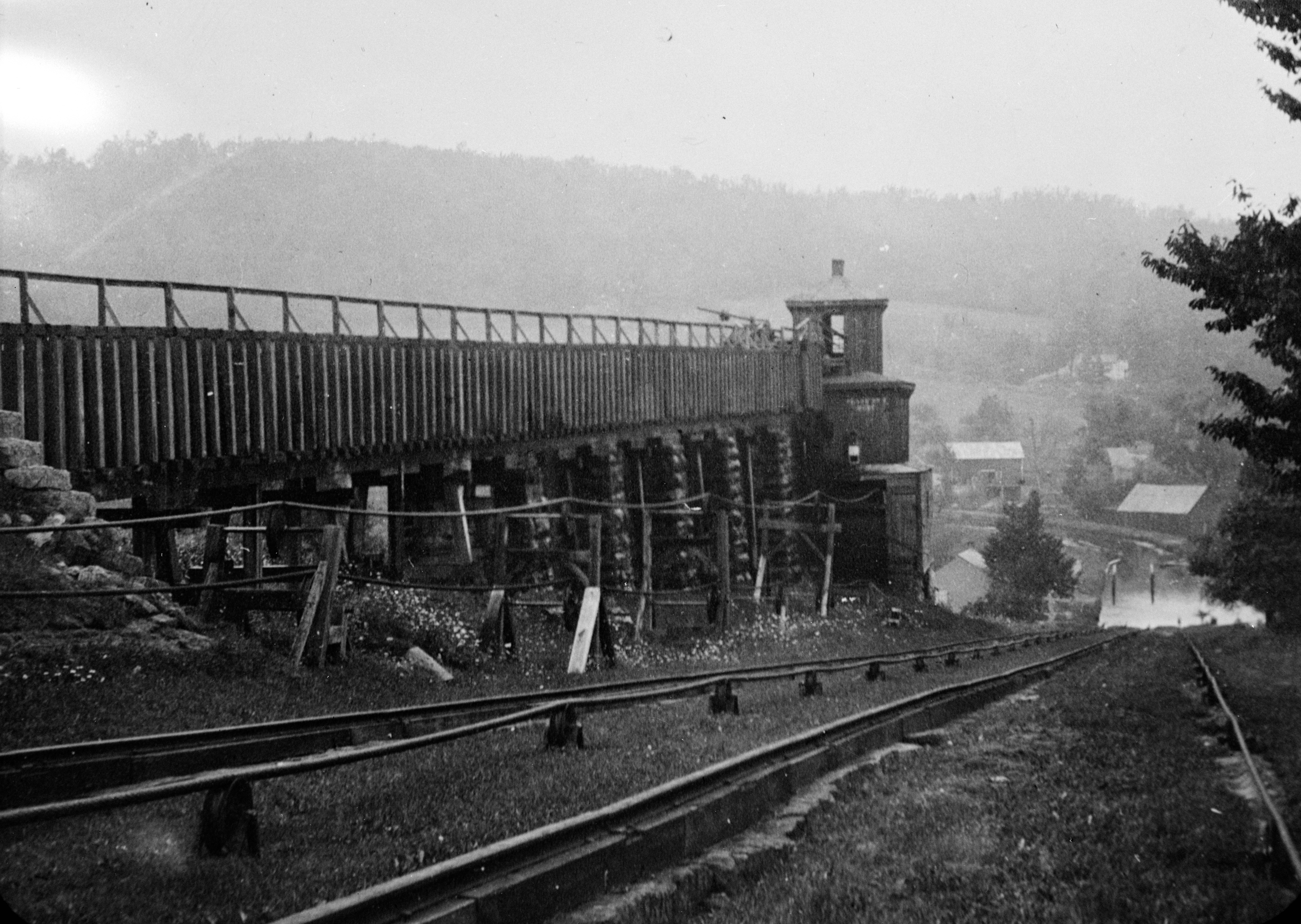
Inclined Plane 7 West on Morris Canal, showing flume, powerhouse, cabling, and track. The cradle can be seen at bottom in the canal. Note how the return cable is on wooden stands with pulleys.

- 1831–1924 – Between 1825 and 1831, 23 inclines were built as part of the Morris Canal, New Jersey, USA. This waterway, 100 miles (160 km) long, connected the Hudson and Delaware Rivers, rising more than 1,400 feet (430 m). In 1832, Frances Trollope, publishes in "Domestic Manners of the Americans" her account of a visit the previous year to see one of the inclined planes of the Morris Canal. In 1924 the canal was abandoned and later dismantled. The Morris Canal's design was reused for the planes on the Elbląg Canal. (see below)
- 1837–1865 – The extension to the Kidwelly and Llanelly Canal, Wales opened in 1837, including two counterbalanced inclined planes and one single-track one.
- 1849–1942 – Inclined plane built on the Monkland Canal near Blackhill, Scotland to supplement existing locks.
- 1860–present – The first four inclined planes of the Elbląg Canal in Germany (East Prussia), nowadays Poland, were opened in 1860. A fifth incline was added later to replace five wooden locks. This canal reused the design from the Morris Canal for its inclined planes.

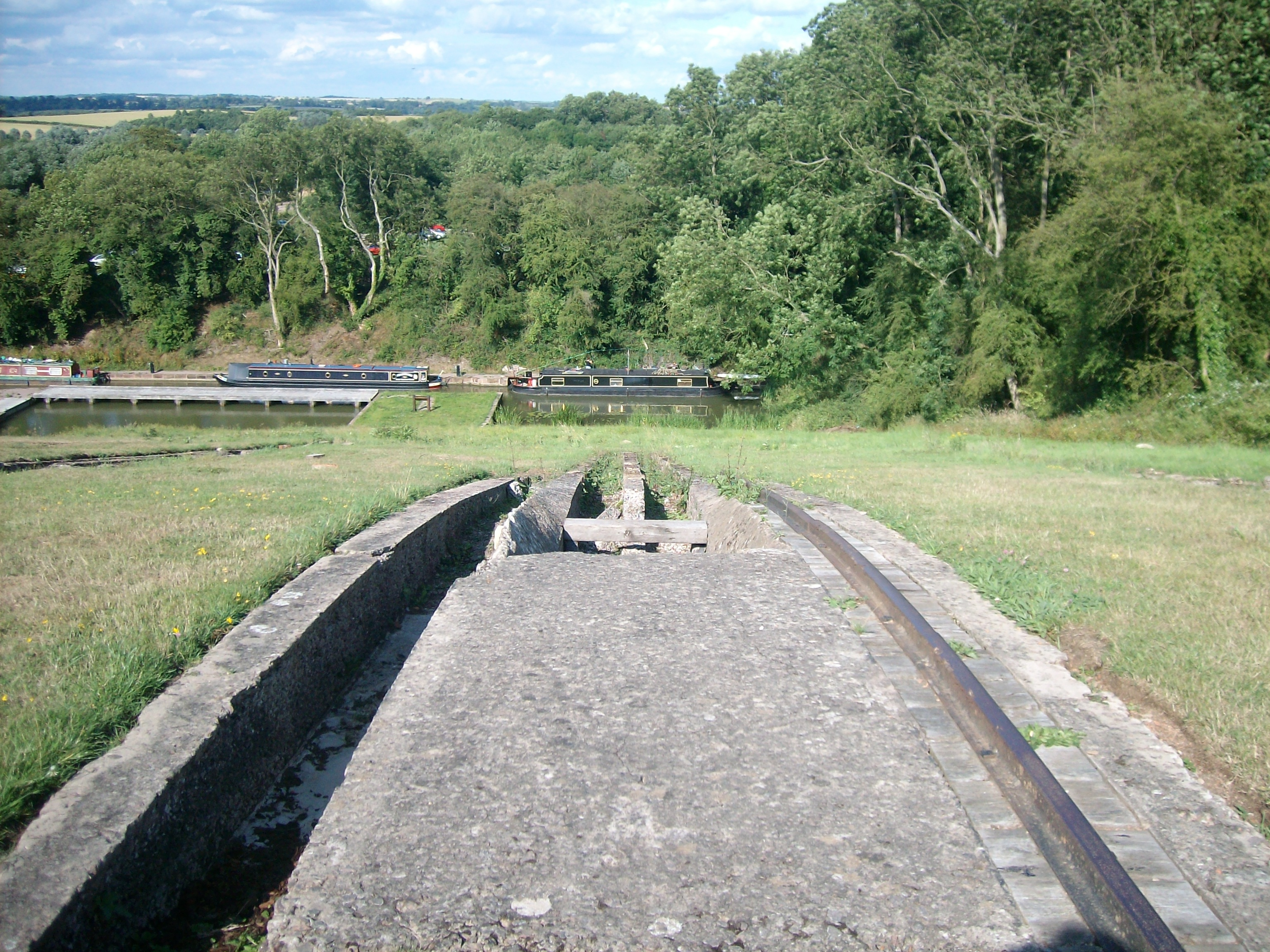
The track of the Foxton Inclined Plane, which is no longer in use

- 1900–1926 – Foxton Inclined Plane was built in England to help overcome shortcomings of the Foxton locks on the Grand Union Canal. Mothballed in 1911 and seeing only occasional use and dismantled in 1926.
- 1969–present – In 1969 the Saint-Louis-Arzviller inclined plane replaced a ladder of seventeen locks over a distance of four kilometers on the Marne–Rhine Canal in France.

== Other examples ==
=== With caissons ===
The electric inclined plane at the Krasnoyarsk Dam in Divnogorsk, Russia The ship capacity is up to 1500 tons, maximum ship size is 80 by 17 by 2 metres (262.5 ft × 55.8 ft × 6.6 ft) and elevation is 104 metres (341 ft). This is an electric rack railway. The track gauge of the railway is 9,000 mm (29 ft 6 5/16 in), making it the widest gauge railway of any type in the world.

=== Without caissons ===
- Morris Canal, Northern New Jersey
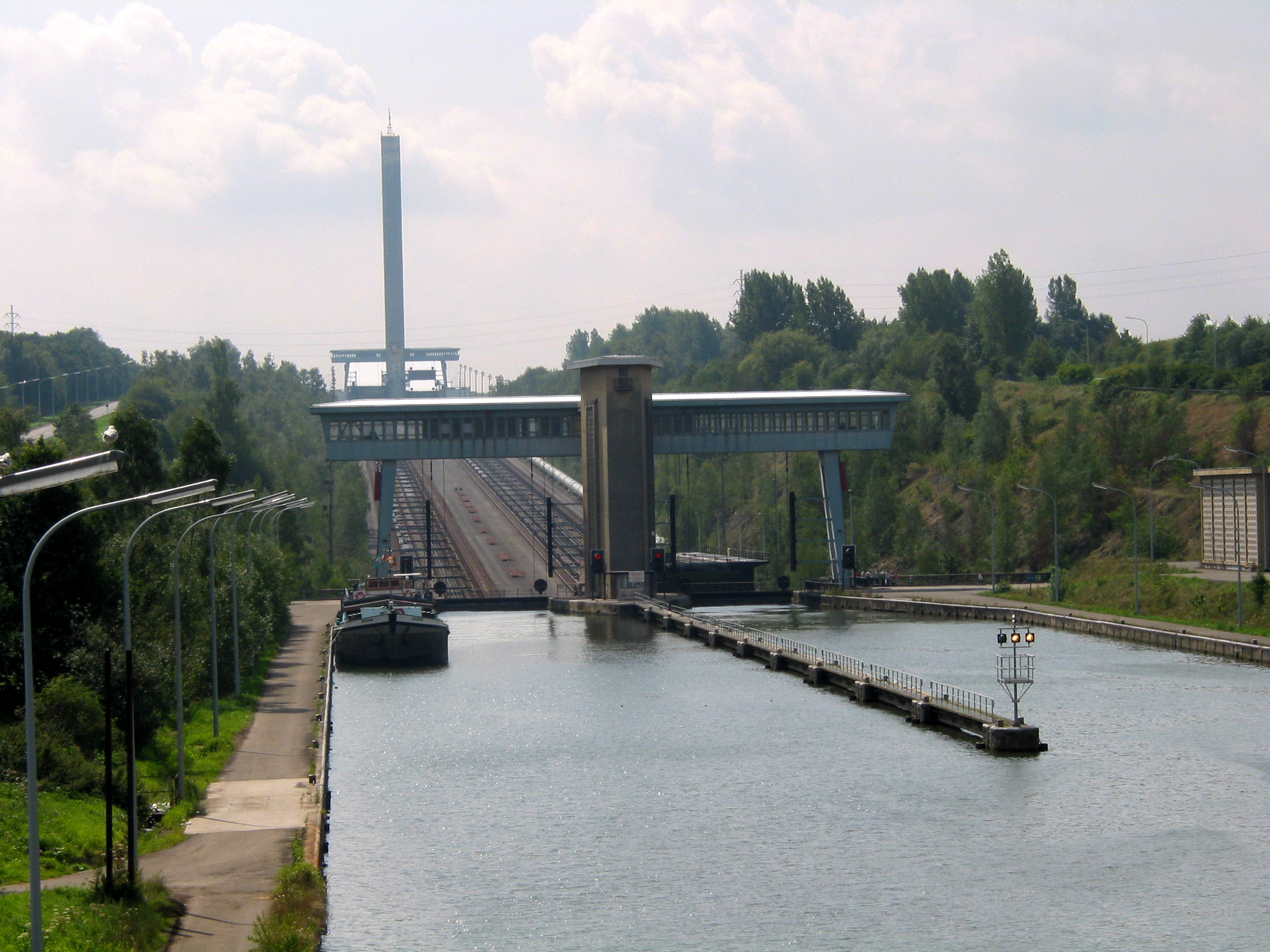
Ronquières inclined plane

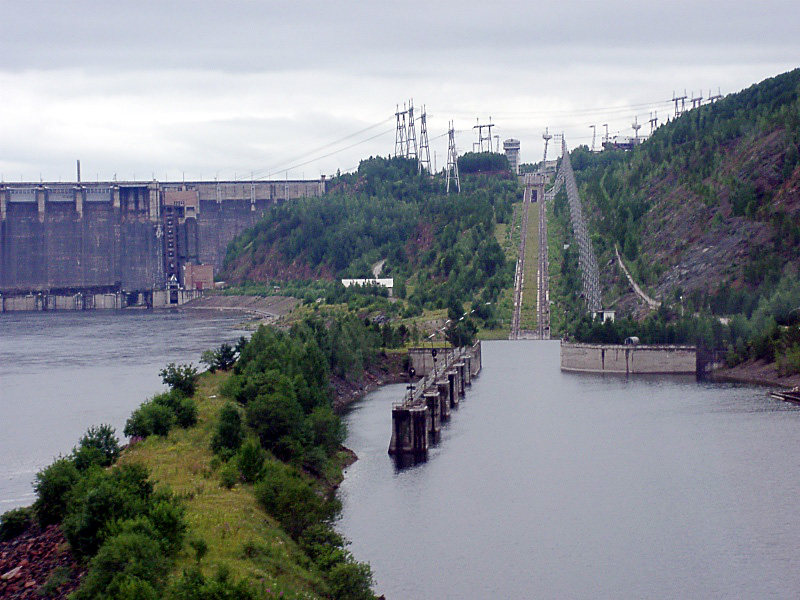
The Krasnoyarsk Dam's inclined plane, an electric rack railway
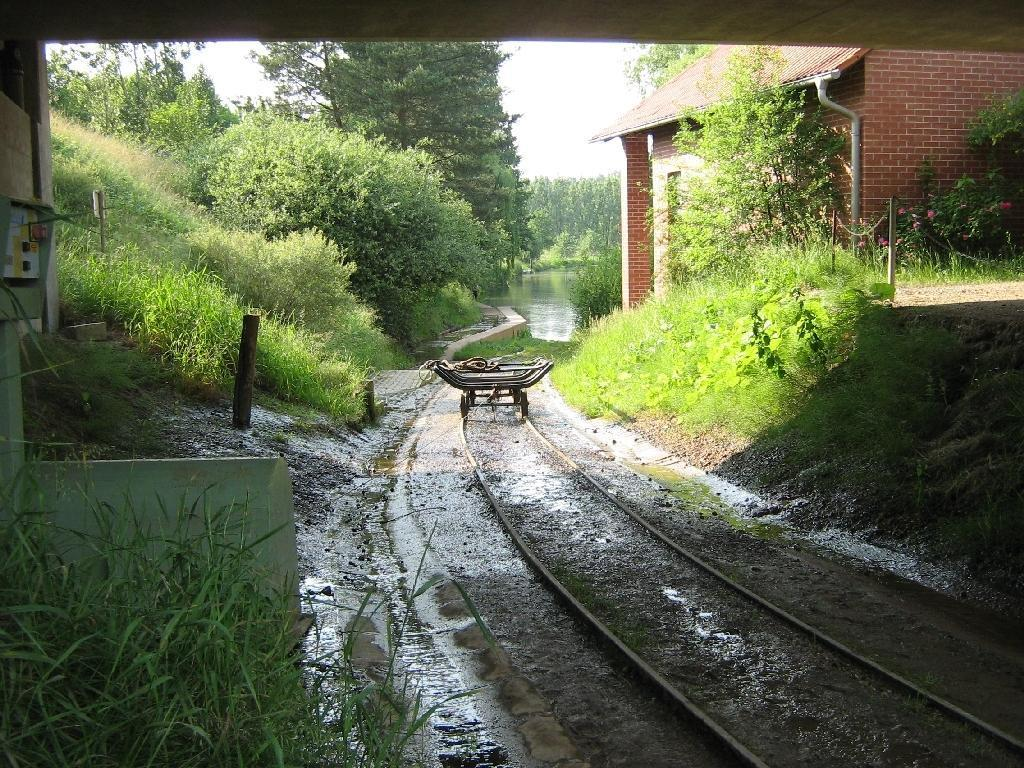
Inclined plane on Dahme Flood Relief Canal, showing the cradle at rest

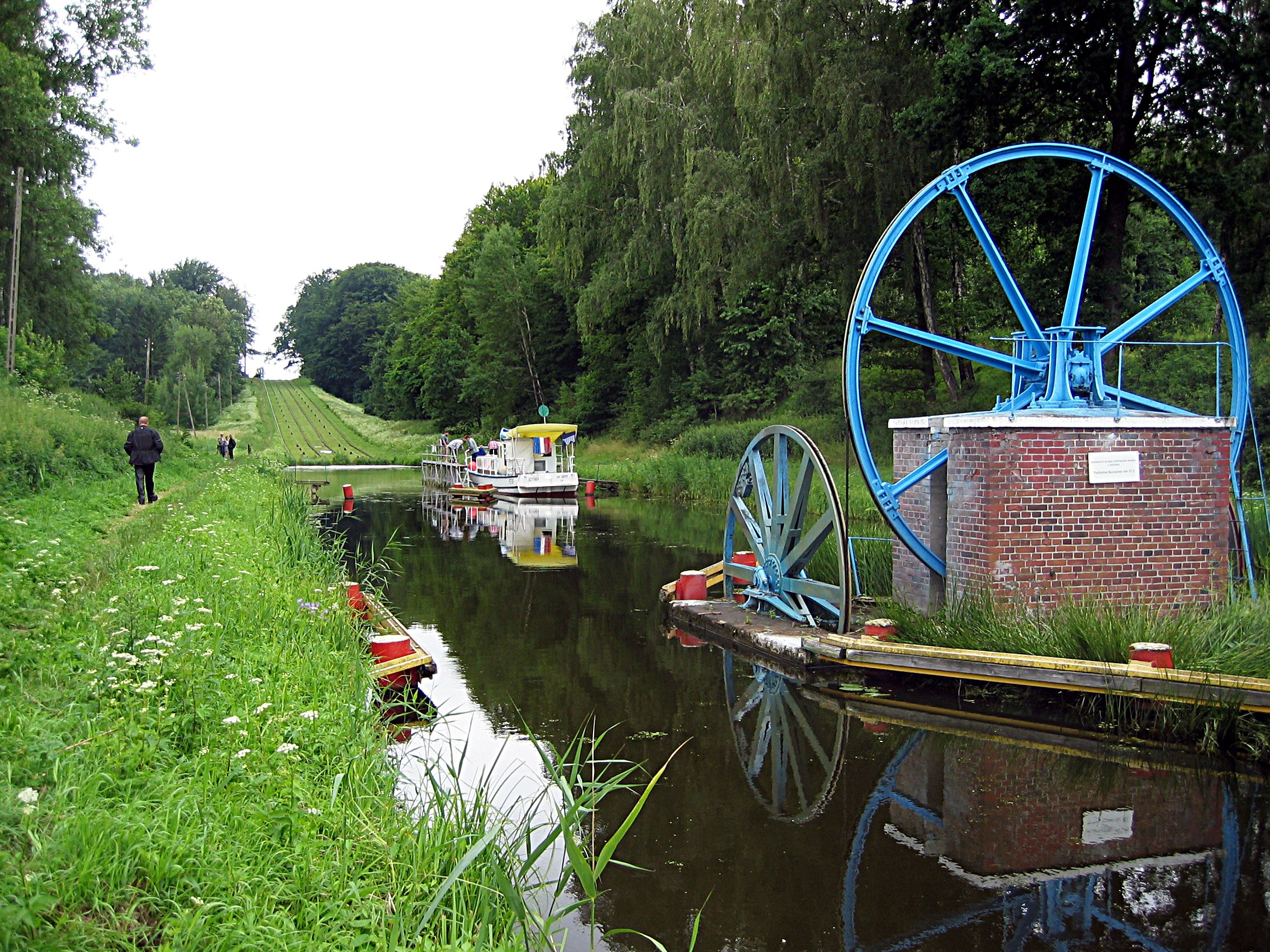
Inclined plane on the Elbląg Canal, showing a vessel entering the cradle

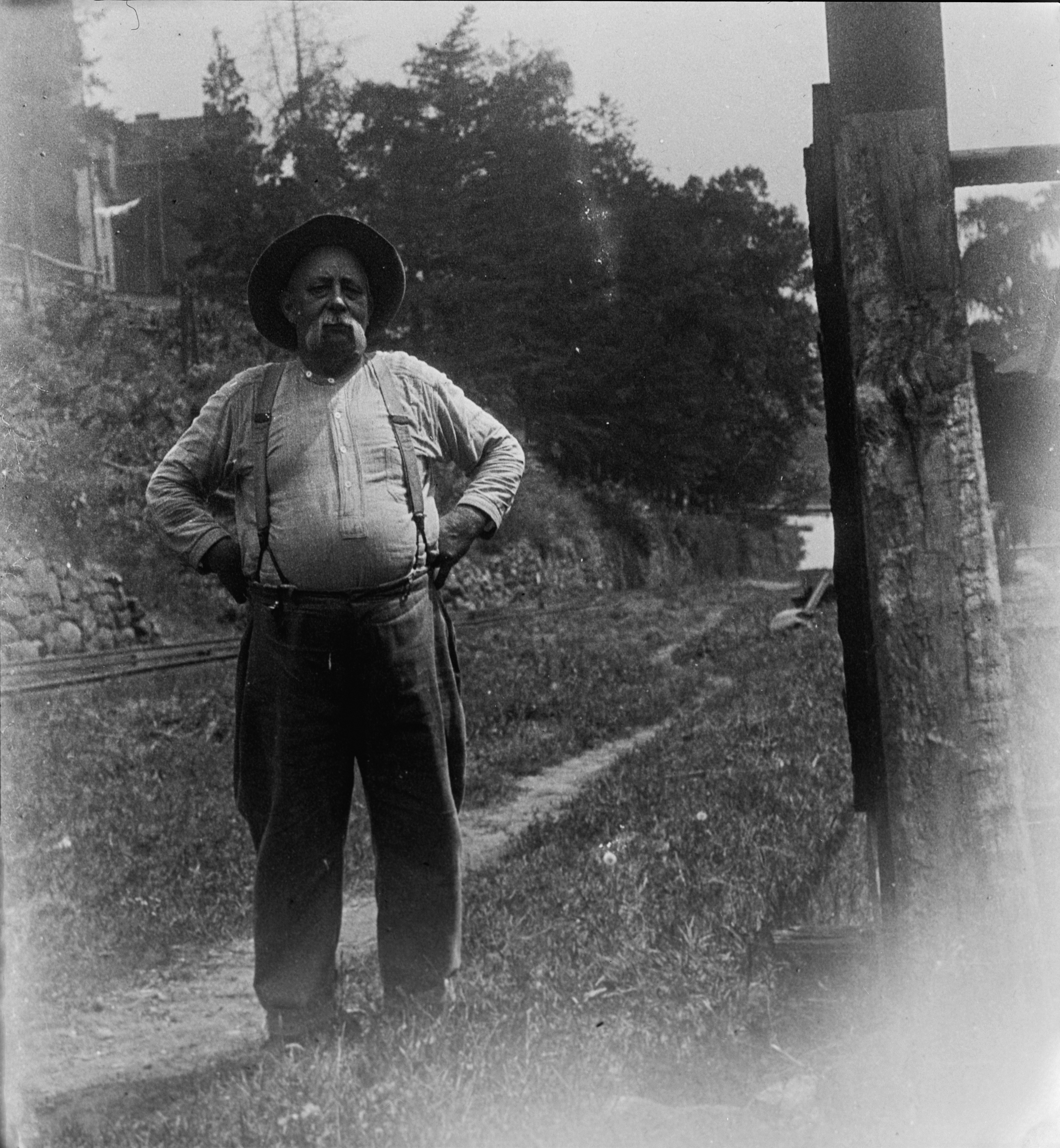
Plane tender at inclined plane 7 East (in background) on the Morris Canal

== See also ==
- Boat lift
- Cable car (railway)
- Cable railway
- Funicular
- Inclined plane – the simple machine
- Lock (water transport)
- Patent slip
- Portage
- Stairlift
- Water slope
