= Richard Reynolds (ironmaster) =

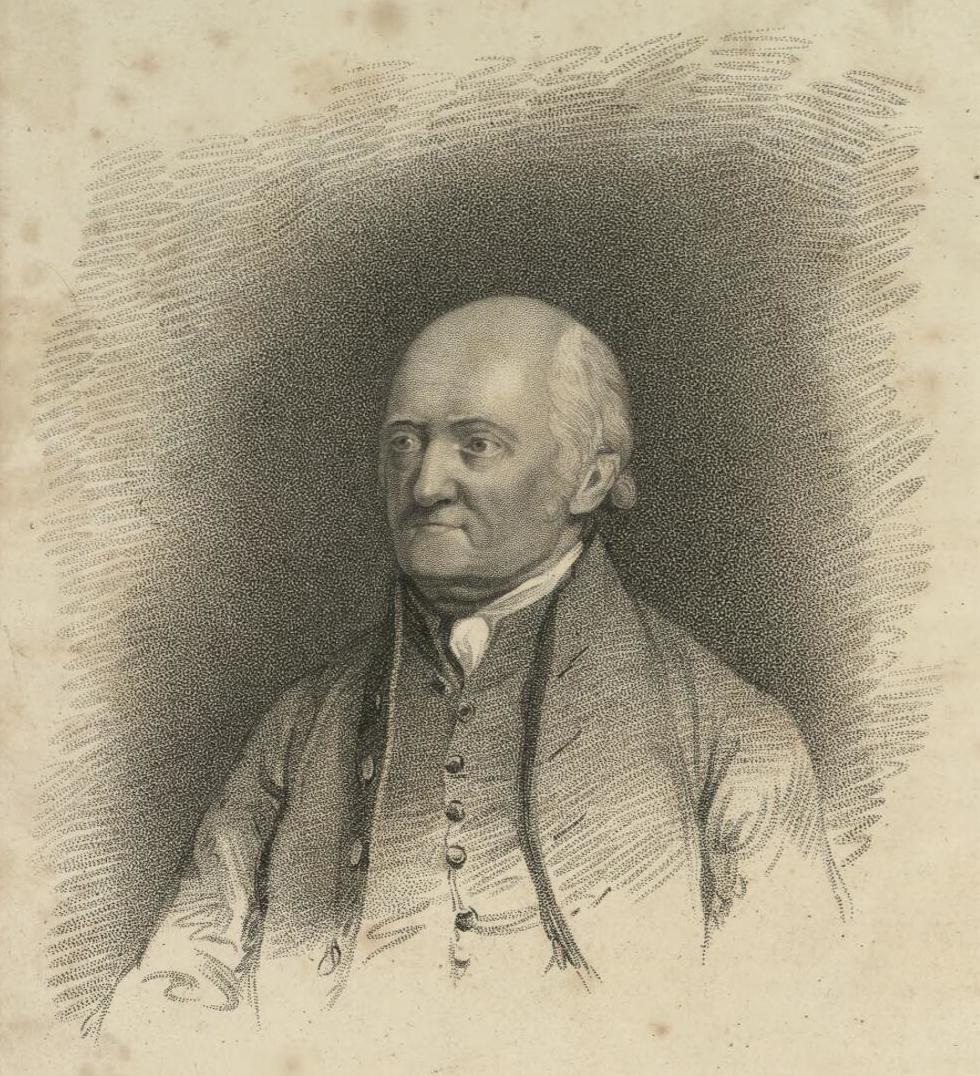
Richard Reynolds, by Henry Hoppner Meyer

Richard Reynolds (November 1735 – 10 September 1816) was an ironmaster, a partner in the ironworks in Coalbrookdale, Shropshire, at a significant time in the history of iron production. He was a Quaker and philanthropist.

== Early career ==
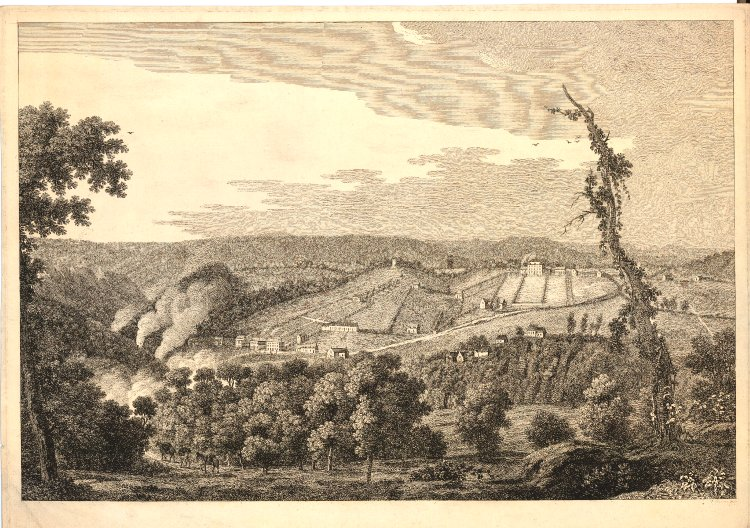
Coalbrookdale in 1758

Richard Reynolds was born in Bristol in 1735, the only son of Richard, an iron merchant, and wife Jane. He was great-grandson of Michael Reynolds of Faringdon, Berkshire, an early Quaker. After his education he was apprenticed in 1749 to William Fry, a grocer in Bristol. After serving the apprenticeship in 1756, he was sent on business to Coalbrookdale, and there he became a friend of Abraham Darby II. He married Darby's daughter, Hannah, at Shrewsbury on 20 May 1757.

He was in charge of Abraham Darby's ironworks at Ketley, near Coalbrookdale, and in 1762 he bought a half share in the Ketley works. When his father-in-law died in 1763, he moved to Coalbrookdale and took charge of the works there, until Abraham Darby III came of age in 1768; he then returned to managing the Ketley works.

== Innovations at Coalbrookdale ==
Reynolds did much to develop and extend the Coalbrookdale works. Under his direction the cylinders of early steam engines were cast there.

=== New refining process ===
In 1766 a patent for refining iron was taken out under his auspices by the Cranege brothers; Thomas Cranege worked at a forge at Bridgnorth and his brother George worked at Coalbrookdale. The new process of converting pig iron into wrought iron used a reverbatory furnace powered by coal, instead of the charcoal used in a finery forge, and so was not dependent on a supply of wood. Reynolds saw its importance, and it seems to have been practically carried out at Coalbrookdale. The process was later developed by Henry Cort.

=== Iron rails ===
In 1767 he replaced the wooden rails, for the railways taking iron and coal from one part of the works to another, with cast iron rails; it is thought this was the first time iron rails were used for transportation.

== Later years ==
From 1768, when Abraham Darby III took over the management, Reynolds remained associated with the concern, and greatly improved the works in the interests of his workpeople. In 1785 he joined in forming the United Chamber of Manufacturers of Great Britain, and himself represented the iron trade. In 1788 he and others obtained an Act of Parliament for the construction of the Shropshire Canal, a canal to supply coal and iron ore to the works. About 1789 he retired from business. By this time the works in the Coalbrookdale area, with associated coal and iron ore mines, were one of the largest iron-making concerns in the country.

In April 1804 he settled in Bristol. Determining to "be his own executor," Reynolds devoted himself to dispensing charity unostentatiously and through private almoners, but on a large scale. It is believed that he usually gave away at least £10,000 a year, besides giving £10,500 to trustees to invest in lands in Monmouthshire for the benefit of Bristol charities.

He died while on a visit to Cheltenham for his health on 10 September 1816 aged 80, and was buried at the Friars, Bristol, on 17 September.

By his first wife, who died in 1762, Reynolds had a daughter, Hannah Mary, and a son William Reynolds (1758–1803), who became a manager of the works and collieries in Ketley and the neighbourhood. By his second wife Rebecca, who predeceased him, he had three sons, Michael, Richard, and Joseph.
