= Shropshire Canal =

Canal in Shropshire, England

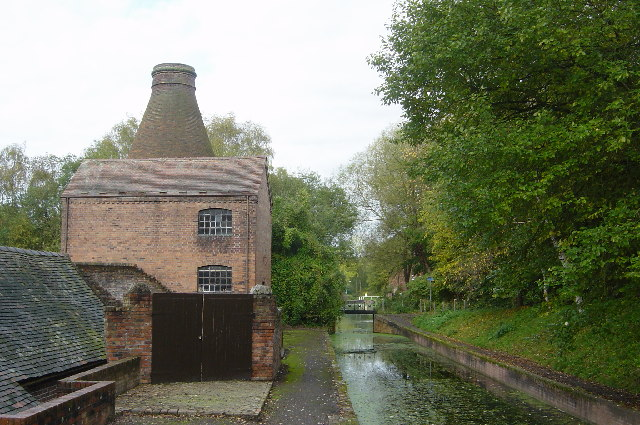
- The Shropshire Canal at Coalport

Specifications
- Locks: 0 (3 inclined planes)
- Status: defunct

History
- Principal engineer: William Reynolds
- Date of act: 1788
- Date completed: 1791
- Date closed: 1912

Geography
- Start point: Old Yard Junction
- End point: Coalport
- Connects to: Donnington Wood Canal, Ketley Canal, Wombridge Canal

The Shropshire Canal was a tub boat canal built to supply coal, ore and limestone to the industrial region of east Shropshire, England, that adjoined the River Severn at Coalbrookdale. It ran from a junction with the Donnington Wood Canal ascending the 316 yard long Wrockwardine Wood inclined plane to its summit level, it made a junction with the older Ketley Canal and at Southall Bank the Coalbrookdale (Horsehay) branch went to Brierley Hill above Coalbrookdale; the main line descended via the 600 yard long Windmill Incline and the 350 yard long Hay Inclined Plane to Coalport on the River Severn. The short section of the Shropshire Canal from the base of the Hay Inclined Plane to its junction with the River Severn is sometimes referred to as the Coalport Canal.

Construction of the canal was completed in 1792, and it operated successfully until the 1830s. The construction and operation of the Hay inclined plane was documented by two Prussian engineers who visited it in 1826 or 1827. In the 1840s it was leased by the Shropshire Union Canal, but was suffering from subsidence by the 1850s. Following nine breaches in 1855 and 1856, it was purchased by the London and North Western Railway company, owners of the Shropshire Union, in 1857 and most of it was closed in 1858. A railway was laid along parts of it, but a small section at the southern end remained in operation until 1912, and was not formally abandoned until 1944. The Hay inclined plane and a section of the canal now form part of the Ironbridge Gorge Museum Trust.

== History ==
William Reynolds was born in Ketley in 1758, the oldest son of Richard Reynolds and his first wife Hannah Darby. His father was an ironmaster and philanthropist, and managed the Coalbrookdale ironworks from 1763 to 1768, during which time the young William served his apprenticeship there. He was extremely able, studying chemistry, taking an interest in geology and other sciences, and keeping a laboratory and library at his home. With his brother-in-law, he had set up a new ironworks at Donnington Wood in 1783. He developed a circle of friends from the engineers and manufacturers who visited Coalbrookdale, including Matthew Boulton, James Watt, 'Iron Mad' John Wilkinson, Thomas Telford, and a number of intellectuals connected with Joseph Plymley.

Shropshire Canal Act 1788
- Act of Parliament
- Parliament of Great Britain
- Long title: An Act for making and maintaining a navigable Canal from the Canal at Donnington Wood in the County of Salop, to or near a Place called Southall Bank, and from thence by Two several Branches to communicate with the River Severn, one near Coalbrook Dale, and the other near Madeley Wood in the said County, and also certain Collateral Cuts to join such Canal.
- Citation: 28 Geo. 3. c. 73
- Territorial extent: Great Britain

Dates
- Royal assent: 11 June 1788
- Commencement: 27 November 1787 (Note: Start of session.)
Other legislation
Amended by	London and North-western Railway Act 1857

Status: Current legislation

Text of statute as originally enacted

Having completed the Wombridge Canal and the Ketley Canal with its inclined plane in 1788, Reynolds, who was by now an innovative ironmaster aged 30, set his sights on a canal from the Donnington Wood Canal to the River Severn. He enlisted the help of various others, including his father Richard Reynolds, John Wilkinson, and Granville Leveson-Gower, who held various titles including Earl Gower and Marquess of Stafford. Reynolds, senior, contributed £6,000, Wilkinson £5,500, Leveson-Gower £2,000, while Reynolds himself contributed £1,000. An act of Parliament, the Shropshire Canal Act 1788 (28 Geo. 3. c. 73), was obtained on 11 June 1788, which created the Company of Proprietors of the Shropshire Navigation, and a meeting was held the following day, at which £50,000 of capital was reported to have been pledged. The authorised share capital was £62,500, divided into 500 shares worth £125 each. The Shropshire Canal Act 1788 listed the names of owners of land through which the canal would pass, and also the names of the 58 subscribers who would form the company of proprietors.

A route for the canal had been surveyed by Reynolds, and it seems likely that he was assisted in this task by the civil engineer William Jessop, since Jessop provided evidence to support the case for the canal during its passage through Parliament. Despite the known success of the inclined plane on the neighbouring Ketley Canal, water in the Ketley Canal was being lost from locks at the incline's summit: the management committee decided to hold a competition for designs for "the best means of raising and lowering heavy weights from one navigation to another." After placing advertisements, they also encouraged the steam engine manufacturers Boulton & Watt to enter. A prize of 50 guineas (£52.50) was offered, and several models were submitted. The committee enlisted the help of John Wilkinson and the inventor and engineer James Watt to judge the designs, and were more generous with prizes than they had advertised, since John Lowden of Snedshill and Henry Williams of Ketley both received £50, and several consolation prizes were also awarded.

Lowden had been appointed as surveyor before the competition was completed, and supervised the work. Progress was quick, as the section from the top of the Wrockwardine Wood inclined plane to the junction with the Ketley Canal was finished in early 1789. The Donnington Wood Canal built a short extension to link to the bottom of the plane. Just a year later, the canal had reached Southall Bank, but Lowden resigned, as the pressure was too great. Two other men also resigned in similar circumstances, but in February 1794, the civil engineer Henry Williams was appointed superintendent and agent for the canal, and remained in this post until 1839, when he retired. Parts of the canal were operational by 3 September 1790, when the first tolls were collected, and the Wrockwardine Wood inclined plane was working soon afterwards. In 1791, most of the main line was serviceable, although piling for the wharves on the River Severn was still taking place in May 1792, and construction was completed by the end of the year.

At the bottom of the Hay inclined plane, a level section of canal ran alongside the river, heading eastwards. Initially there was a lock into the river, with a fall of 22 feet 10 inches (6.96 m) but since tub-boats were unsuitable for use on the river, and river boats could not use the canal, it was soon found to be redundant, and filled in. A number of warehouses were built between the canal and the river, with small inclined planes leading from the warehouses to wharfs on the river.

When completed, the main line was about 7.75 miles (12.5 km) long, while the Horsehay branch, which was opened in 1792, was about 2.75 miles (4.4 km) long. The total cost of the project was below the original estimate, at either £47,000 or £47,500. Although there were no locks, water was still lost from the canal, and a number of reservoirs were built to keep it supplied with water.

=== Operation ===
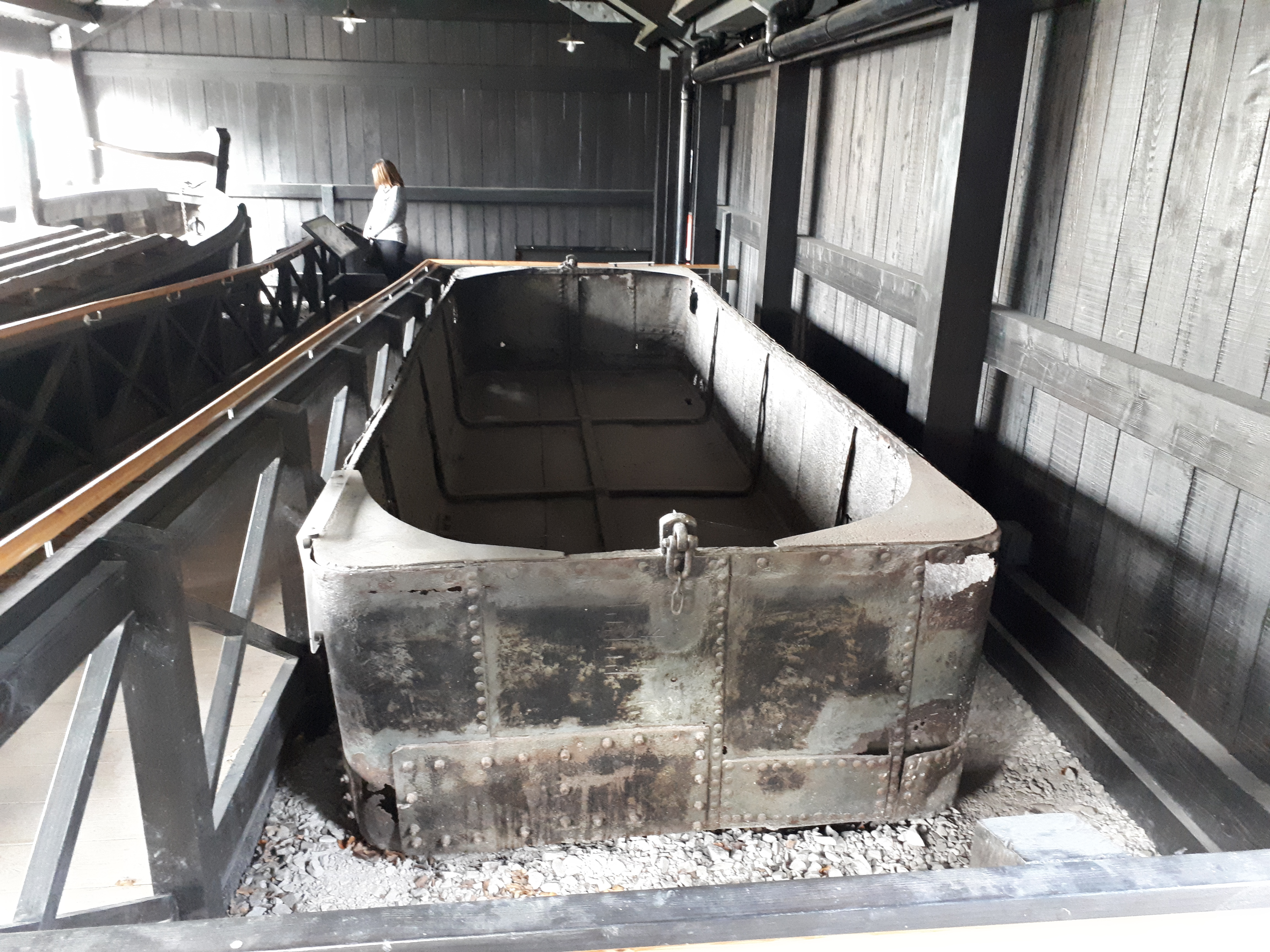
An iron tub boat at Blists Hill Museum. It was rescued from a farm in 1972, and prior to its discovery, it was thought that all tub boats on the Shropshire Canal were made of wood.

The route included three tunnels and three inclined planes. Near to Wilkinson's iron works at Snedshill, the Snedshill Tunnel was 279 yards (255 m) yards long, and the Stirchley Tunnel was slightly longer at 281 yards (257m). There was also a short tunnel under the London to Holyhead road. They were about 10 feet (3.0 m) wide at water level, and 13 feet (4.0 m) high. The canal was somewhat wider, at 16 feet (4.9 m) and was 4.5 feet (1.4 m) deep. The design of the inclined planes was modified from that used on the Ketley Canal, where there was a lock at the top, which resulted in a loss of water each time the plane was used. Instead Reynolds used a system where the boats passed over a hump, after which a short downward-sloping section took the boats into the canal. This virtually eliminated water loss, but required the provision of a steam engine at each of the inclines. On the Wrockwardine Wood inclined plane, most of the traffic was in the uphill direction, and so the steam engine was used to raise the boats up the incline. On the other inclines, the traffic was downhill, and so they were counterbalanced, with the descending load raising the empty boats on the other track. The engine was only required to assist the boat over the hump at the top.

The Wrockwardine Wood inclined plane was 360 yards (330 m) long and lifted the canal by 120 feet (37 m). The Windmill inclined plane was much longer at 600 yards (550 m) dropping the level by 126 feet (38 m), while the Hay inclined plane was the steepest, descending 207 feet (63 m) in 350 yards (320 m). While the Wrockwardine Wood plane was worked by a steam engine from the start, the engines for the other two planes were not ready when they began operation, and the initial movement of the boats was assisted by horses until 1793, when the engines were commissioned. The canal joined the Ketley Canal at Oakengates. However, there was a difference in the water levels and a lock was required to compensate for the 1 ft (0.3m) drop. At its southern end, to the south of Southall wharf, the canal split into two, with the main line continuing to Coalport via the two inclined planes, and the Horsehay branch running to Brierley Hill, terminating on the hill about 120 feet (37 m) above the Coalbrookdale works. A tramway from the works tunnelled into the hill, ending in a cavern below the terminus of the canal. From here two vertical shafts 120 by 10 feet (36.6 by 3.0 m) were constructed, with coal and iron ore descending and limestone ascending in crates. Because the bulk of the transfers were from the canal to the tramway, and limestone was lighter by volume than ironstone, the system was self-powered. Expenditure on the apparatus was £2,742, and the system was operational by 4 October 1792. The shafts and tunnel belonged to the Dale Company, and the Shropshire Canal decided not to take them over when they were completed. Instead the Dale Company charged tolls for their use. Despite heavy usage, with 1,801 tons of coal descending in the six weeks from 2 September 1793, the system was not a success, and was replaced by a tramway inclined plane in 1794. The tramway was soon extended along the length of the Horsehay branch, making the canal redundant.

The company was run by industrialists, who were keen to keep the tolls low, as many of them used the canal to transport their own merchandise. Despite this, an initial dividend of 2.5 per cent was declared in 1793, only a year after construction was completed, and dividends rose steadily to reach around 8 per cent in the 1830s. The terminus at Coalport developed rapidly, with housing to create a village, two potteries, a factory making ropes, and a works manufacturing chains. By 1810 the facilities were proving to be inadequate, and a new basin with capacity for 60 tub boats was constructed, while the wharfs were also extended. Although there are no exact figures, it has been estimated that some 100,000 tons of cargo passed through the warehouses each year during the canal's peak years, most of it coal and iron.

=== Inclined planes ===
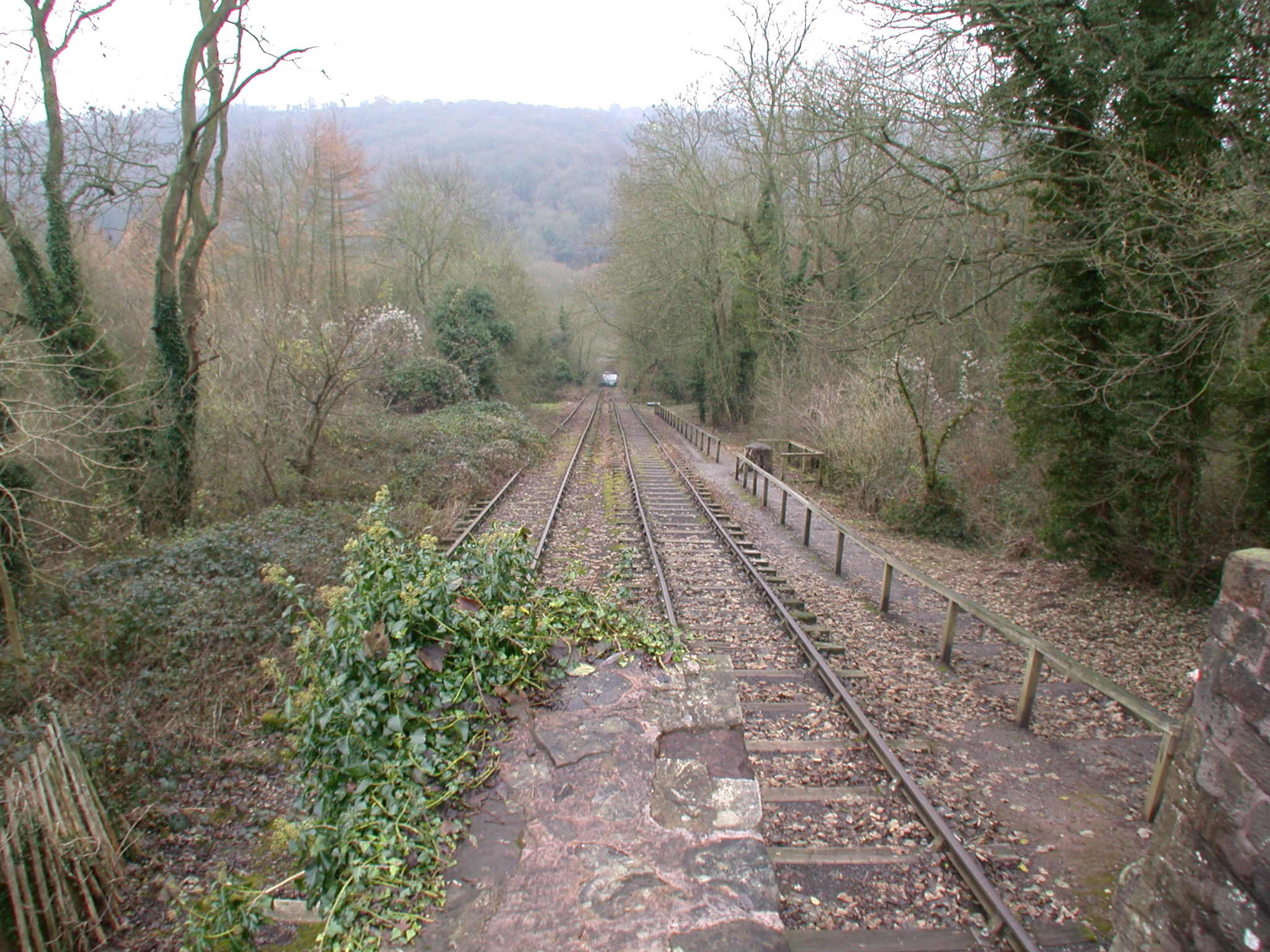
Looking down the Hay Inclined Plane

In 1826 and 1827, two Prussian engineers visited Britain to look at a number of railways, and the construction and operation of the Hay inclined plane was described in some detail in their subsequent publication. The rails were made of cast iron, and were "L" shaped in section. The running surface was 7 inches (180 mm) wide by 2 inches (51 mm) thick, while the vertical flange was 2.5 inches (64 mm) tall and 1 inch (25 mm) thick. They were described as the strongest and thickest that they had seen. Most of the incline was laid with only three rails, with a small section in the middle which had four rails, so that the boats could pass one another. Because the flanges were on the rails rather than on the wheels as in modern railway practice, one track had the flanges on the inside, and the other on the outside. The rails were fixed to timbers running along the incline, 14 inches (360 mm) square, which were attached to wooden sleepers which ran across the incline.

The boats were made of wood, and were 18 feet (5.5 m) long by 5 feet 2 inches (1.57 m) wide. They were 2.5 feet (0.76 m) deep, and weighed about 1.5 tons, but when loaded with 5 tons of coal or iron, only 3 inches (76 mm) remained above the water. In order to transport them along the incline, they were attached to a simple frame with four wheels, with a diameter of 27 inches (690 mm) at the front and 16 inches (410 mm) at the back. The rear axle carried a second set of wheels, 24 inches (610 mm) in diameter and spaced much wider than the main wheels, which ran on a special track at the top of the incline, and prevented the frame from getting stuck when it passed over the hump. These wheels were flanged, unlike the main wheels. The main wheels are described as having an inside gauge of 43 inches (1,100 mm), presumably between their inside faces. The engine was a 16-inch (410 mm) steam engine, and was used to draw the wagon and boat over the hump and out of the top pound. It was also used to complete the movement of an ascending boat, which would no longer be counterbalanced once the descending boat entered the water at the bottom. The engine drove a 7-foot (2.1 m) drum, which carried the rope, and which had a clutch mechanism to allow it to be driven by the engine or disconnected from it, as required.

Apart from one incline in the mines at Worsley, these were the only ones which carried boats until around 1819, and many visitors came to see them. Each incline required a team of four men to operate it. An engineman and a brakesman worked at the top of the incline, and a man was needed at each end to attach or detach the boats from the rope. Between the inclines, the boats were operated in trains, and Stephen Ballard, who visited the canal from the Herefordshire and Gloucestershire Canal in 1829, recorded that a single horse could pull 12 loaded boats with 60 tons of cargo, and trains of 18 or 20 boats could also be managed.

=== Takeover and decline ===
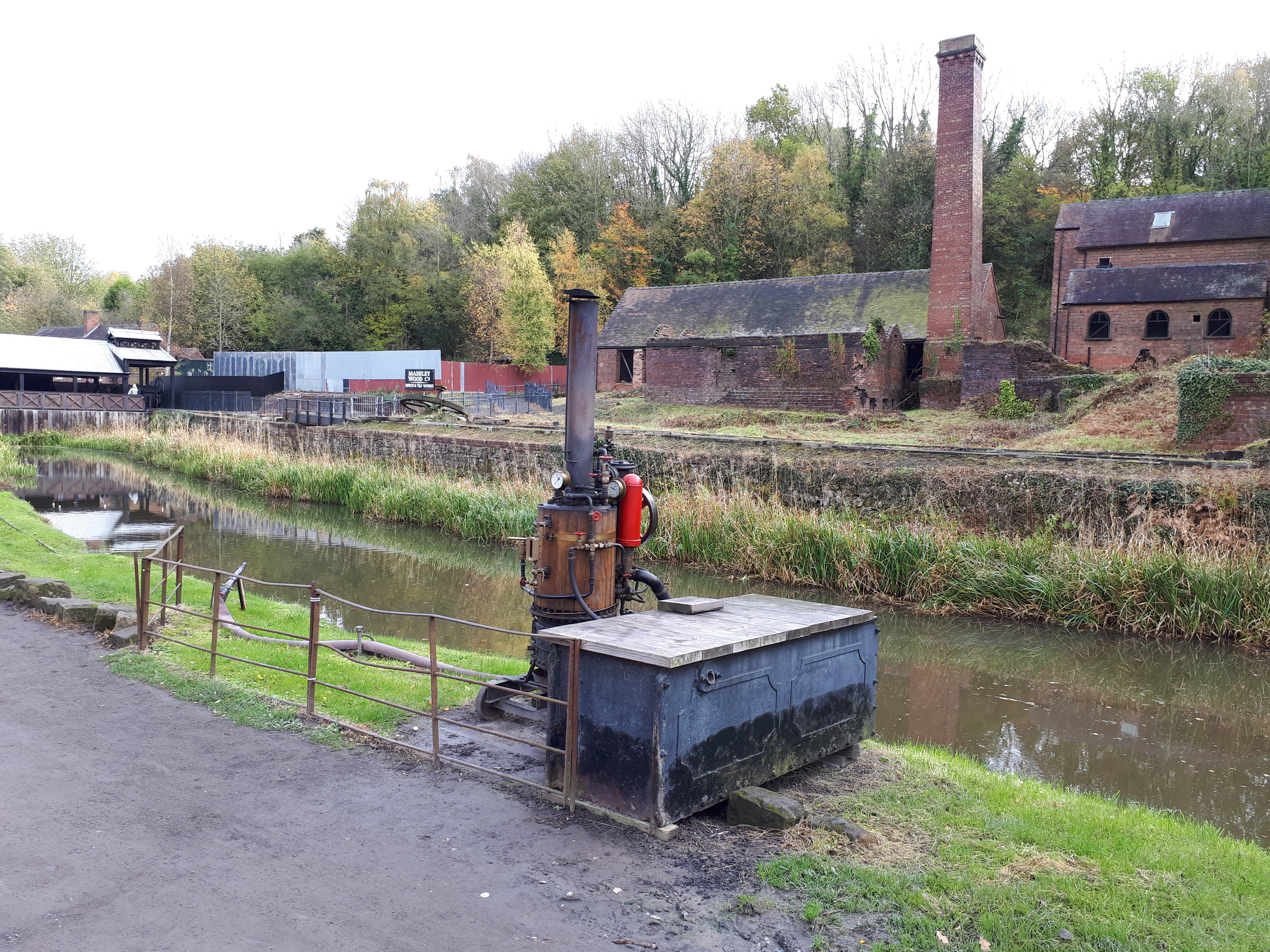
The canal at Blists Hill passes in front of the derelict Madeley Wood Brick and Tile Works

In 1845, the Ellesmere and Chester Canal Company took over the Birmingham and Liverpool Junction Canal, and appointed a committee to consider how best to convert them to railways, and what extensions might be necessary to provide a comprehensive transport network. The following year, the company became the Shropshire Union Railways and Canal Company, by the Shropshire Union Railways and Canal (Shrewsbury and Stafford Railway) Act 1846 (9 & 10 Vict. c. cccxxiii) which authorised the new company to take over the Shrewsbury Canal and to buy the Montgomery Canal and the Shropshire Canal. In 1847, the Shropshire Union Company agreed to the terms of a lease from the London and North Western Railway Company (LNWR), and so lost its independence after little more than a year, but continued to manage the canals under its control.

The 500 shares of the Shropshire Canal were initially valued at £150 each, making it worth £75,000. It was making around £4,000 per year, and rather than buying it, the Shropshire Union decided to lease it instead, for an annual sum of £3,125. The agreement began on 1 November 1849. There were serious problems with subsidence, and the manager recommended that the canal should be converted into a railway in January 1855, but although the Shropshire Union board agreed, their recommendation to the LNWR was ignored. In July 1855, a breach of the canal occurred, when it broke through into the Oakengates railway tunnel. The summit level emptied, causing floods in the town. A second breach occurred in September, on a section which had been re-routed over a mine shaft to make way for the Shrewsbury and Birmingham Railway, and seven more occurred the following year. The LNWR then obtained the London and North-western Railway Act 1857 (20 & 21 Vict. c. cviii), which allowed them to buy the canal for £62,500, and to close it from the Wrockwardine Wood inclined plane to the Windmill inclined plane, and use the bed for a railway. Closure took place on 1 June 1858. Parts of the bed were used for a railway to Coalport, which opened in 1861. The Stirchley tunnel was converted into a cutting as part of this project.

By 1894, the Hay incline was no longer in use, but the section from Kemberton and Halesfield collieries was used to carry coal to Blists Hill furnaces until 1912. 29,066 tons of coal were carried in 1905. The furnaces were blown out in 1912, but this section of the canal was not officially abandoned until 1944, along with much of the rest of the Shropshire Union system.

== Route ==
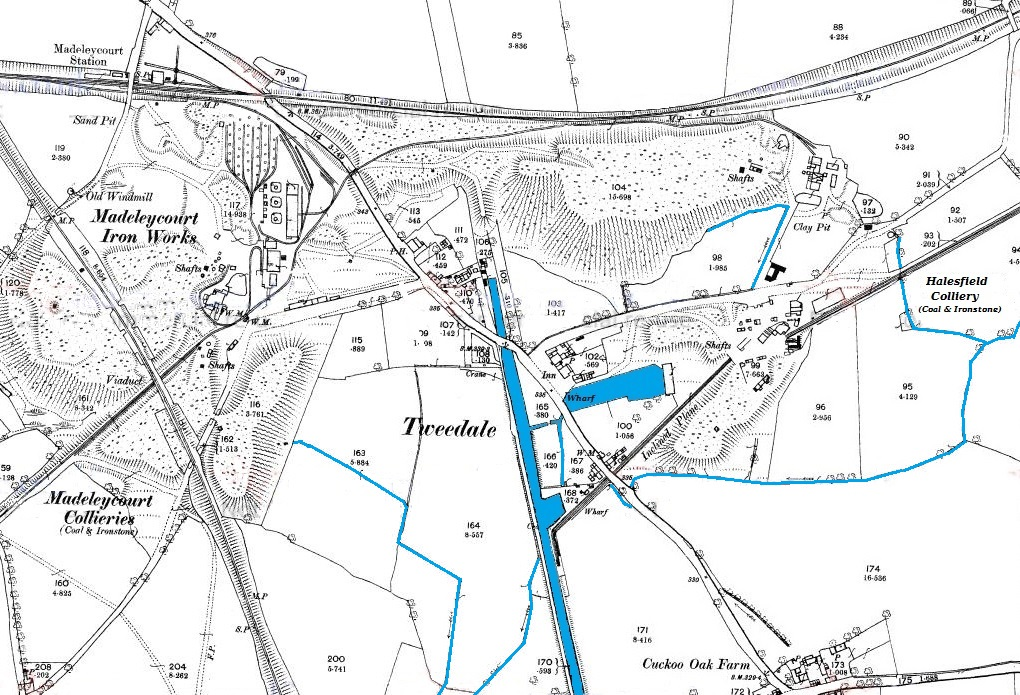
Map of the canal basins at Tweedale in 1883

From Wrockwardine to Coalport, the canal headed broadly southwards. From its junction with the Donnington Wood Canal, the route almost immediately ascended the Wrockwardine incline, to reach a basin and wharf at the top. It was crossed by the road from St Georges to Oakengates, once part of the Roman Watling Street and entered Snedshill Tunnel. Snedshill Ironworks with its furnaces stood on the western bank, and beyond them, a wharf where the Ketley Canal joined from the west. Shortly after passing through a short tunnel under the London to Holyhead road, Hollinswood Ironworks stood on the west bank. Set further back were the Old Park Furnaces, while a little further south were Dark Lane Furnaces, owned by the Botfields. The eastern bank was the location of Randlay Pool, one of the reservoirs used to supply the canal.

Continuing southwards, the Stirchley Furnaces, also owned by the Botfields, were on the east bank, with the Jerry Furnaces, where there was a forge and rolling mills, on the west. The Bishtons owned Langley Furnaces, which were some 0.5 miles (0.80 km) to the west of the canal, and they were connected to the canal by a tramway. There was another reservoir on the west bank before the canal reached Stirchley Tunnel, beyond which the route divided. The route to Coalport turned eastwards before turning back to the south, where there were boat repair sheds and the head of Windmill incline. Below the incline, the canal was crossed by another road and entered Tweedale Basin. A tramway connected the basin to the Madeley Court Furnaces, to the west of the canal, and a rather longer one served Halesfield and Kemberton Collieries, both of which also supplied the canal with water which was pumped from the workings. A tramway connected the two collieries, both of which also produced ironstone, and a long tramway inclined plane descended to a small side basin on the line of the canal. The 1883 Ordnance Survey map shows a much larger basin a little to the north, with a wharf at its western end. Railways and spoil heaps had obliterated the canal beyond the basin by this date. Brown includes a picture of two ladies and a gentleman standing in a tub boat, which is in the basin. It was owned by W Richards, the last person to operate tub boats on the southern section of the canal. There is also a picture of the overgrown basin in 1957, with a wooden tub boat clearly visible.

The village of Madeley was located to the west of the canal, but the chainmakers Edge and Company had a foundry to the east of Queen Street Bridge, and there was a China Works belonging to Martin Randall to the west of Hill's Lane bridge. Hill's Lane Colliery, to the east, was another facility served by a tramway. There was a cement mill to the east and a corn mill to the west, before the canal reached Shawfield Colliery on the east bank. A tramway crossed the canal and turned to the south, running parallel to the canal to reach Blist's Hill Brickworks. It was used to deliver pit spoil to the brickworks. Blist's Hill was a busy place, with boat building and repair sheds, brick and tile works on both sides of the canal, and Blist's Hill Furnaces, owned by the Madeley Wood Company. They were the last operational cold-blast furnaces in Shropshire. Another tramway brought coal from Meadow Pit, some distance to the north-west, to the wharf at Blist's Hill. The inclined plane at Hay was the steepest of the inclines, and descended to a short section of canal that ran eastwards, parallel to the River Severn, where goods were transhipped to river boats.

=== Branch canal ===
Immediately after the junction near Stirchley Tunnel, the canal passed over an aqueduct across the road to the village of Aqueduct, and then began curving round to the north-west. Dawley Castle Furnaces were to the north of the canal, and Botany Bay Colliery to the south. There were several other small collieries near the route, which followed the contours to a point near Doseley church. A tramway headed northwards to Horsehay Furnaces, while the canal turned sharply to the south. Two bridges carried Holywell Lane and Green Lane over it, before it reached the "Wind", the name given to the twin shafts which descended 120 feet (37 m) to the Coalbrookdale Works and its tramway. After just two years, they were replaced by an inclined plane, on which tramway wagons were used, rather than boat cradles.

== Legacy ==
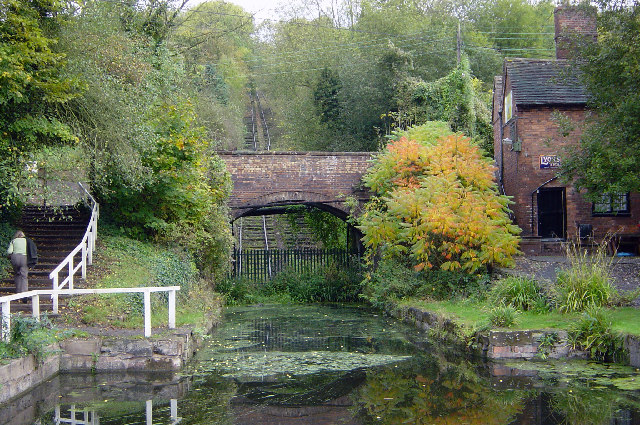
A grade II listed bridge crosses the bottom of the Hay inclined plane

Several points along the Shropshire Canal are historical waypoints on the South Telford Heritage Trail, a 12.2-mile (19.6 km) circular route that explores the region's industrial archaeology. Much of the route has been destroyed by the building of houses and industrial development associated with the new town of Telford, but some of the larger features remain. The Wrockwardine Wood inclined plane can be traced, although it has been severed by a new road junction. Both the tunnels have gone, and the site of the junction with the Horsehay branch was obliterated by the Coalport branch railway line. An aqueduct that carried the canal over a minor road near the hamlet of Aqueduct is grade II listed. The remains of the Brierley Hill tunnel and vertical shafts were rediscovered in February 1988, when the site owner found the top of a 10-foot (3.0 m) brick built circular shaft. Its identity was subsequently confirmed by the Ironbridge Gorge Museum Trust Archaeological Unit. Nearby, parts of the inclined plane that replaced the lifts are traceable, although some parts have collapsed. Nearly a mile (1.6 km) of the main line immediately above the top of the Hay inclined plane can be traced, and although full of weed, contains some water.

The inclined plane at Hay, which was last used in 1894, was restored in 1968 and again in 1975, including the reinstatement of rails. There are the remains of a building with a chimney stack at the top of the incline, which was probably the engine house. A grade II listed bridge carries a road over the bottom of the plane. In 1967, the Dawley Development Corporation, who were responsible for Dawley New Town, later renamed Telford, decided that important industrial sites at Coalbrookdale, Coalport, Blists Hill, and several others, should be preserved and restored. Blists Hill Open Air Museum was opened to the public in 1973, and has since become the Blists Hill Victorian Town.

== Points of interest ==
Point	Coordinates (Links to map resources)	OS Grid Ref	Notes
Wrockwardine Wood inclined plane	52.7071°N 2.4418°W	SJ702122	
Snedshill Tunnel	52.6900°N 2.4460°W	SJ699103	
Stirchley Tunnel	52.6540°N 2.4516°W	SJ695063	
Brierley Hill tunnel and shafts	52.6440°N 2.4869°W	SJ671052	
Aqueduct	52.6504°N 2.4530°W	SJ694059	
Windmill inclined plane	52.6460°N 2.4426°W	SJ701054	
Top of Hay inclined plane	52.6225°N 2.4515°W	SJ695028	
Bottom of Hay inclined plane	52.6202°N 2.4532°W	SJ694025	
End of Coalport wharf	52.6169°N 2.4446°W	SJ699022	

== See also ==
- Canals of Great Britain
- History of the British canal system
- Caisson lock

== Bibliography ==
- Brown, Ivor J (1999). The East Shropshire Coalfield. Tempus Publishing. ISBN 978-0-7524-1705-9.
- Cumberlidge, Jane (2009). Inland Waterways of Great Britain (8th ed.). Imray Laurie Norie and Wilson. ISBN 978-1-84623-010-3.
- Hadfield, Charles (1985). The Canals of the West Midlands. David and Charles. ISBN 978-0-7153-8644-6.
- Morriss, Richard K (1991). Canals of Shropshire. Shropshire Books. ISBN 978-0-903802-47-5.
- Priestley, Joseph (1831). "Historical Account of the Navigable Rivers, Canals, and Railways of Great Britain". Archived from the original on 8 March 2016.
- Russell, Ronald (1971). Lost Canals of England and Wales. David and Charles. ISBN 978-0-7153-5417-9.
- Skempton, Sir Alec; et al. (2002). A Biographical Dictionary of Civil Engineers in Great Britain and Ireland: Vol 1: 1500 to 1830. Thomas Telford. ISBN 978-0-7277-2939-2.
- Von Oeynhausen, Carl; Von Dechen, Heinrich (1971). Railways in England 1826 & 1827. Transl. Forward, E.A. W Heffer & Sons (for Newcomen Society). ISBN 978-0-85270-048-8.
- Williams, W Howard (1980). Shropshire Canals (A collection of articles). Shropshire Libraries. ISBN 978-0-903802-11-6.
