= Wombridge Canal =

Canal in Shropshire, England

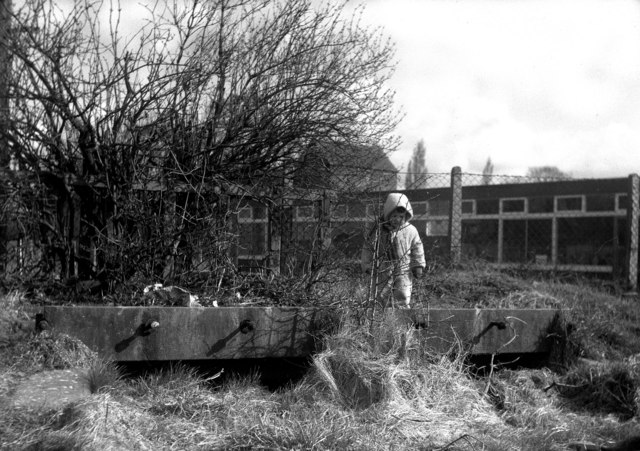
- Remains of a bridge over the infilled canal at Wrockwardine Wood in 1963

Specifications
- Status: destroyed

History
- Principal engineer: William Reynolds
- Date completed: 1788
- Date closed: 1921

Geography
- Connects to: Shrewsbury Canal, Donnington Wood Canal

The Wombridge Canal was a tub-boat canal in Shropshire, England, built to carry coal and iron ore from mines in the area to the furnaces where the iron was extracted. It opened in 1788, and parts of it were taken over by the Shrewsbury Canal Company in 1792, who built an inclined plane at Trench. It lowered tub boats 75 feet (23 m), and remained in operation until 1921, becoming the last operational canal inclined plane in the country. The canal had been little used since 1919, and closed with the closure of the plane.

== History ==
Iron ore and coal were mined at Wombridge, near to the church. In order to transport it to the furnaces at Donnington Wood, William Reynolds started to build a tub-boat canal in 1787. It was completed in 1788, at a cost of £1,640 and was 1.75 miles (2.82 km) long, connecting with both the furnaces and the Donnington Wood Canal. A curious feature of the canal was the tunnel which was constructed near to the church. There is no obvious reason for it, and it has been suggested that it was built to placate a local landowner. Another feature was an iron bridge, built in sections, which carried Teague's Bridge Lane over the canal. Subsequently, the Shrewsbury Canal Act 1793 (33 Geo. 3. c. 113) created the Shrewsbury Canal Company, with powers to build a canal from Wombridge to Shrewsbury. The company bought 1,848 yards (1.690 km) of the canal at a cost of £840. Although this price was considerably less than the cost of construction, Reynolds was both a shareholder and a director of the new company, and the act of Parliament specifically waived any tolls for his own internal traffic. It is also likely that he had exhausted the supplies at minerals at Wombridge by this time.

The new company constructed an inclined plane, to transport tub boats from the level of the Wombridge Canal, down to that of the Shrewsbury Canal. It was 243 feet (74 m) long, with a fall of 75 feet (23 m). It consisted of twin railway tracks, each with a cradle in which a single tub-boat was carried. Power was provided by an engine supplied by the Coalbrookdale Company. This was replaced in 1842 by a new engine that lasted for 79 years, until the final demise of the incline on 31 August 1921. Most of the working traffic was in the downward direction of the incline, and was counterbalanced by empty tub-boats returning up to the top level. The inclined plane was the last operational canal plane in the country.

A prominent feature near the top of the incline was the Wombridge Pumping Engine house. This was a Cornish type, with a tall chimney, and was erected in 1858, to pump water from the mines. The main cylinder was 60 inches (150 cm) in diameter, with a 10-foot (3.0 m) stroke, and it lifted water from a depth of around 600 feet (180 m). The engine developed 250 hp (190 kW) and normally ran slowly, raising 3,338 imperial gallons (15.17 m^{3}) of water per minute, in three strokes. When running at maximum speed, it could achieve eleven strokes per minute.

=== Industry ===
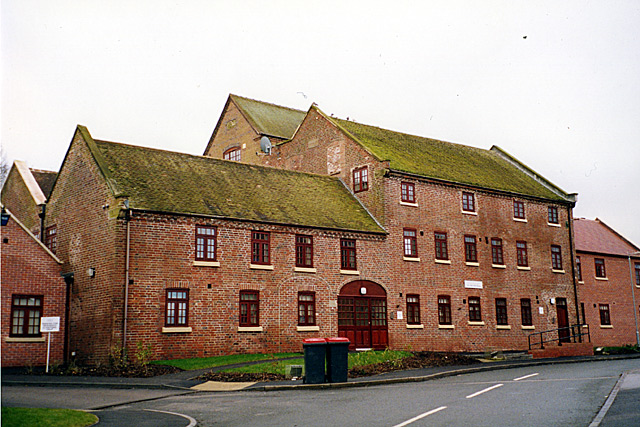
Bullock's Mill, built beside the canal in 1818, has now been converted into apartments. The canal ran behind the building.

Prior to selling the canal to the Shrewsbury Canal Company, Reynolds' sons, William and Joseph, erected a glass house near to Church Road Bridge, just to the south of the current Wrockwardine Wood church building. They made a variety of objects from dark green glass, including door-stops, rolling pins, jugs and bottles for French wine manufacturers. They flourished for over 40 years, until the factory closed between 1835 and 1842. Less than 300 yards (270 m) to the west, John Bullock erected a corn mill by the side of the canal in 1818. It produced flour, and the company continued to be run by the Bullock family until the 1940s, after which it was run by new owners. The building was constructed of red brick, and powered by a steam engine. The original building had two storeys, but a new four-storey structure was added to the rear in 1891. The business closed in the 1970s and the mill has since been converted into apartments.

The third industrial enterprise was owned by James Foster, who built two furnaces at Wombridge in 1818. He added a third furnace sometime before 1843, when he closed the operation and moved it to Madeley Court. In 1854, John Bennett, working for the Wombridge Iron Company, reopened it, and added a forge. It continued in use until 1900, producing wire and wire rods.

== Decline ==
In 1919, new furnaces were built at Wombridge and most of the rest of the canal fell into decline from then onwards. The canal was abandoned in 1921 when the inclined plane was closed. In 1968, material from the embankment and docks of the inclined plane was used to fill in the basin, destroying what remained. The Wombridge engine house survived the demise of the inclined plane, but was destroyed on 27 December 1964, when 82 pounds (37 kg) of gelignite were used to demolish it.

== Points of interest ==
Point	Coordinates (Links to map resources)	OS Grid Ref	Notes
Junction with Donnington Wood Canal	52.7087°N 2.4406°W	SJ703124	
Church Road Bridge	52.7100°N 2.4470°W	SJ698125	
Teague Bridge	52.7088°N 2.4550°W	SJ693124	
Top of Trench Incline	52.7068°N 2.4602°W	SJ690122	
Wombridge Ironworks Basin	52.7043°N 2.4565°W	SJ692119	
Railway Bridge	52.7014°N 2.4539°W	SJ694116	
End of southern branch	52.7005°N 2.4581°W	SJ691115	

== Bibliography ==
- Baggs, A P; et al. (1985). "Wombridge: Communications". A History of the County of Shropshire. Victoria County History. Vol. 11. Telford. Archived from the original on 28 September 2017.
- Brown, Ivor (2010). "Some Notes on the Mines of the Lilleshall Company, No.5" (PDF). Journal of the Shropshire Caving & Mining Club (Autumn Issue No. 2010.3). Archived (PDF) from the original on 27 September 2017.
- Ware, Michael E (1989). Britain's Lost Waterways. Moorland Publishing. ISBN 978-0-86190-327-6.
- Williams, W Howard (1980). Shropshire Canals (A collection of articles). Shropshire Libraries. ISBN 978-0-903802-11-6.
