= Rolt =

Rolt is a surname, and may refer to:

- Peter Rolt, notable businessman and entrepreneur
- Sir Andrew Bayntun-Rolt, 2nd Baronet
- Cecil Rolt, Dean of Cape Town
- Edward Rolt (c.1629–1698), soldier, diplomat and friend of Samuel Pepys
- Edward Rolt (1686–1722), MP for Chippenham
- Sir Edward Bayntun-Rolt, 1st Baronet
- Sir John Rolt (British Army officer), (died 1856)
- Sir John Rolt (1804–1871), English lawyer and Attorney-General
- L. T. C. Rolt, also known as Tom Rolt, (1910–1974), English writer and biographer
- Mary Constantia Rolt (d. 1767), granddaughter of Edward Rolt
- Peter Rolt (1798–1882), British businessman and politician
- Richard Rolt (bapt 1724, d. 1770), writer, poet, and librettist
- Samuel Rolt (1671–1717), MP for Bedford, half brother to Edward Rolt (1686–1722)
- Sonia Rolt (1919–2014), campaigner for the Inland Waterways Association and wife of L. T. C. Rolt
- Stuart Peter Rolt (1862–1933), general in the British Army
- Sir Thomas Rolt (1631–1710), Governor of Bombay
- Thomas Rolt (gentleman) (1641–1672) Fellow of the Royal Society
- Tony Rolt (1918–2008), English Formula One driver
