= Andrew Bayntun-Rolt =

British politician (1755–1816)

Sir Andrew Bayntun-Rolt 2nd Baronet, of Spye Park

Member of Parliament for Weobley

Personal details
- Born: 28 September 1755 Spye Park, Bromham, Wiltshire
- Died: 16 August 1816 (aged 60)
- Resting place: St Nicholas Church, Bromham, Wiltshire
- Citizenship: British
- Spouses: Maria Alicia Coventry; Anna Maria Maud
- Domestic partners: Harriet Maria Poynter; Anne Power
- Parents: Sir Edward Bayntun-Rolt, 1st Baronet; Mary Poynter
- Occupation: Landowner, politician and High Sheriff of Wiltshire

Sir Andrew Bayntun-Rolt, 2nd Baronet (1755–1816), of Spye Park, Bromham, Wiltshire, was a British politician who sat in the House of Commons from 1780 to 1786.

Baynton-Rolt was the only surviving son and heir of Sir Edward Bayntun-Rolt, 1st Baronet and his wife Mary Poynter of Herriard, Hampshire. Although some secondary sources dispute his year of birth, the 1755 baptism register of St Nicholas' Church, Bromham, Wiltshire - a primary source - documents his birth on 28 September 1755 and his baptism on 31 October 1755 to Edward and Mary He succeeded his father in the baronetcy on 3 January 1800. In 1802-03, he was High Sheriff of Wiltshire.

== Parliamentary career ==
Bayntun-Rolt was returned unopposed as Member of Parliament for Weobley on the interest of Lord Weymouth at a by-election on 31 March 1780. He was returned unopposed again at the ensuing general election of 1780, and again in 1784. There is no record of his having spoken in the House. He appears to have been used as a placeholder as he resigned his seat in April 1786 when Weymouth's eldest son was old enough to sit for Parliament.

== Family life ==
Bayntun-Rolt married firstly Lady Mary Alicia Coventry (1754–84), daughter of George Coventry, 6th Earl of Coventry, by special license at the Earl of Coventry's house at 148 Piccadilly, London, on 28 June 1777, with a daughter:

- Maria Barbara Bayntun-Rolt (1780-1870), who married Rev. Dr John Starky (1770-1834), DD on 9 August 1797 at St James, Piccadilly, London

His wife became involved in an adulterous relationship with John Allen Cooper and the couple were divorced on 24 June 1783.

Bayntun-Rolt married secondly Anna Maria Maud (1754-1827) on 18 May 1787 at St Botolph's, Aldersgate, the daughter of John Maud (1714–82) and his wife Elizabeth Primatt (1725-), with no known issue. This marriage also foundered.

Bayntun-Rolt had numerous illegitimate children in Spye Park and Bromham, Wiltshire by his partner, Harriet Maria Poynter (1764-1839). Several of these children did not reach maturity, including:

- Lucy Bayntun (1791-)
- Ann Bayntun (1792-)
- Harriet Bayntun (1793-)
- Edward Bayntun (1795-)
- Mary Bayntun (1796-)
- Andrew Bayntun (1797-)
- Edward Thomas Bayntun (1798-)
- John Bayntun (1799-)
- Sally Rosalie Bayntun (1801-)
- Elizabeth Bayntun (1802-)
- John Charles Bayntun (1805–30)
- Henry Bayntun (1807-)
- Maria Constantia Bayntun (1808-)

Bayntun-Rolt had a further 6 illegitimate children in Corsham, and the Bathampton, Batheaston, Swainswick and Larkhall areas of Bath, Somerset by his partner, Anne Power (ABT 1781-1844), of Lambridge, Bath. Most of these children did reach maturity, including:

- Wilmot Robert Bayntun Power (1801–89)
- Charles Bayntun Power (1802–42)
- Martha Bayntun Power (1804–81)
- Anne Bayntun Power (1808–54)
- Francis Bayntun Power (1809–78)
- George Bayntun Power (1810–88)

Bayntun-Rolt died on 12 August 1816. Although his will acknowledged and made provision for his surviving illegitimate children, he had no surviving legitimate male issue and so his title became extinct. Spye Park and the remainder of his personal estate went to his only surviving legitimate child, Maria Barbara.

A memorial exists on the south wall of St Nicholas' Church, Bromham, Wiltshire, close by his family estate of Spye Park.

After Bayntun-Rolt's death, Harriet Maria Poynter married Aristeus Lovel on 4 September 1820 at Wyke Regis, Dorset, with no further issue. Anne Power married Robert Gomery (1778-1853) on 17 October 1822 at Walcot, Bath, Somerset with no further issue.

The Spye Park estate was sold in 1864 to pay the gambling debts of John Bayntun Starky (1834–72), a grandson of Maria Barbara Bayntun Starky, during her lifetime, and thus passed out of the family.

Wilmot Robert Bayntun Power (1801–89) was the grandfather of Charles Edwin George Bayntun (1873-1940), known as George Bayntun, who founded the Bath-based bookbinding business.

== Ancestors ==
Ancestors of Andrew Bayntun-Rolt

16. Edward Rolt
8. Thomas Rolt (ABT 1631-1710)
34. Sir Oliver Cromwell (ABT 1562-1655)
17. Mary Cromwell (died 1634)
35. Anne Hooftman
4. Edward Rolt (c.1684-1722)
18. Thomas Coxe (1615-85)
9. Mary Cox (died 1716)
2. Edward Bayntun-Rolt (1710-1800)
40. Edward Bayntun (1593-1657)
20. Edward Bayntun (1618-1679)
41. Elizabeth Maynard
10. Henry Bayntun (1664-91)
42. Thomas Thynne (c.1610-1669)
21. Stuarta Thynne (1643-1680)
43. Stuarta Balcanquhall
5. Anne Bayntun (1689-1734)
44. Henry Wilmot (1612-58)
22. John Wilmot (1647-1680)
45. Anne St John (1614-96)
11. Anne Wilmot
46. John Malet (died 1656)
23. Elizabeth Malet (1651-1681)
47. Unton Hawley (died 1698)
1. Andrew Bayntun-Rolt (1755-1816)
6. Charles Pointer (1681-)
3. Mary Poynter (1718-1799)
7. Elizabeth Wigge (1682-)

Parliament of Great Britain
Preceded by Sir William Lynch; John St Leger Douglas	Member of Parliament for Weobley; 1780–1786; With: John St Leger Douglas 1780–1783 (Sir) John Scott 1783–1786	Succeeded by Hon. Thomas Thynne (Sir) John Scott
Baronetage of Great Britain
Preceded by Edward Bayntun-Rolt	Baronet (of Spye Park); 1800–1816	Extinct
