= George Bayntun =

English bookbinder (1873–1940)

- Born: Charles Edwin George Bayntun; 4 August 1873; Bath, Somerset, England
- Died: 4 September 1940 (aged 67); Bath, Somerset, England
- Occupations: Bookbinder, Book collector and Bookseller
- Spouse: Fanny Louisa Shearn
- Mother: Constance Amelia Bayntun

Charles Edwin George Bayntun, more commonly known as George Bayntun (4 August 1873 – 4 September 1940) was an English bookseller, bookbinder, and collector.

== Early life ==
George Bayntun was born Charles Edwin George Bayntun on 4 August 1873 Bath, Somerset, England to Constantia Amelia Bayntun (1836–1921) and an unknown father. He was a grandson of Wilmot Robert Bayntun Power or Bayntun (1801–1889), who was in turn an illegitimate son of Sir Andrew Bayntun-Rolt, 2nd Baronet (cir 1740–1816).

Bayntun served a book-binding apprenticeship before starting his own book-binding business in Northumberland Place in 1894.

== Career ==
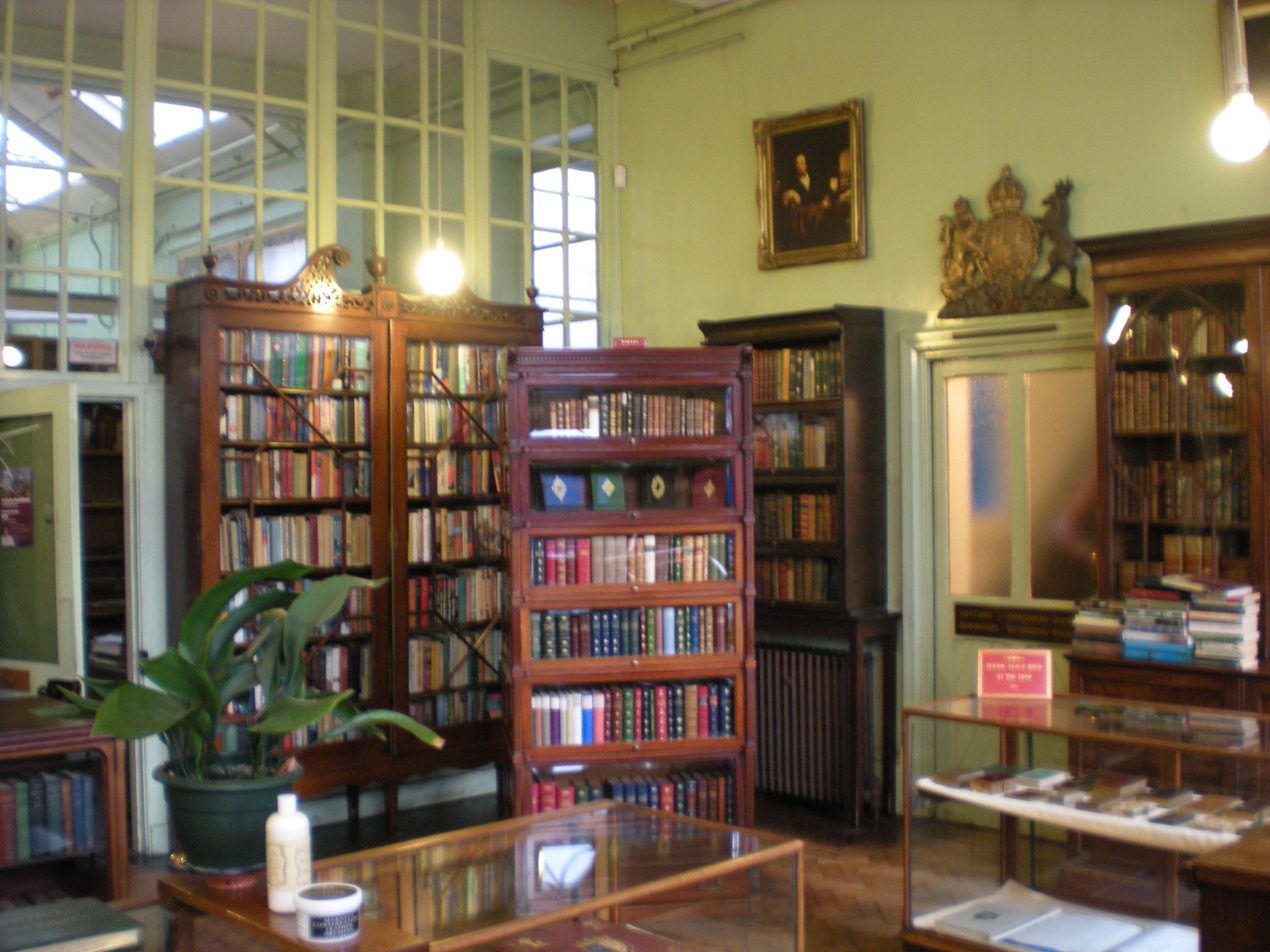
George Bayntun's bookshop in Bath (modern view)

He took on a number of London binders in order to raise the standard of craftsmanship in his own bindery and soon afterwards moved the business into larger premises on Walcot Street in Bath. In 1920, he purchased the bindery business of George Gregory, and in 1939, the Bayntun and Rivière binderies were incorporated into a new set of premises on Manvers Street in Bath, from where the business still operates today.

Bayntun adhered to traditional book binding techniques, and built a strong relationship with many American dealers, Arthur Brentano of Brentano's, Maurice Inman, and Nat Ladden. On one occasion, A. S. W. Rosenbach hosted a lunch in his honour on a visit to New York City in 1936.

Bayntun's last years were crowned by the patronage of Queen Mary, who spent the World War II years near Bath. She granted the firm the royal appointment of Bookseller to Her Majesty in 1950.

== Family ==
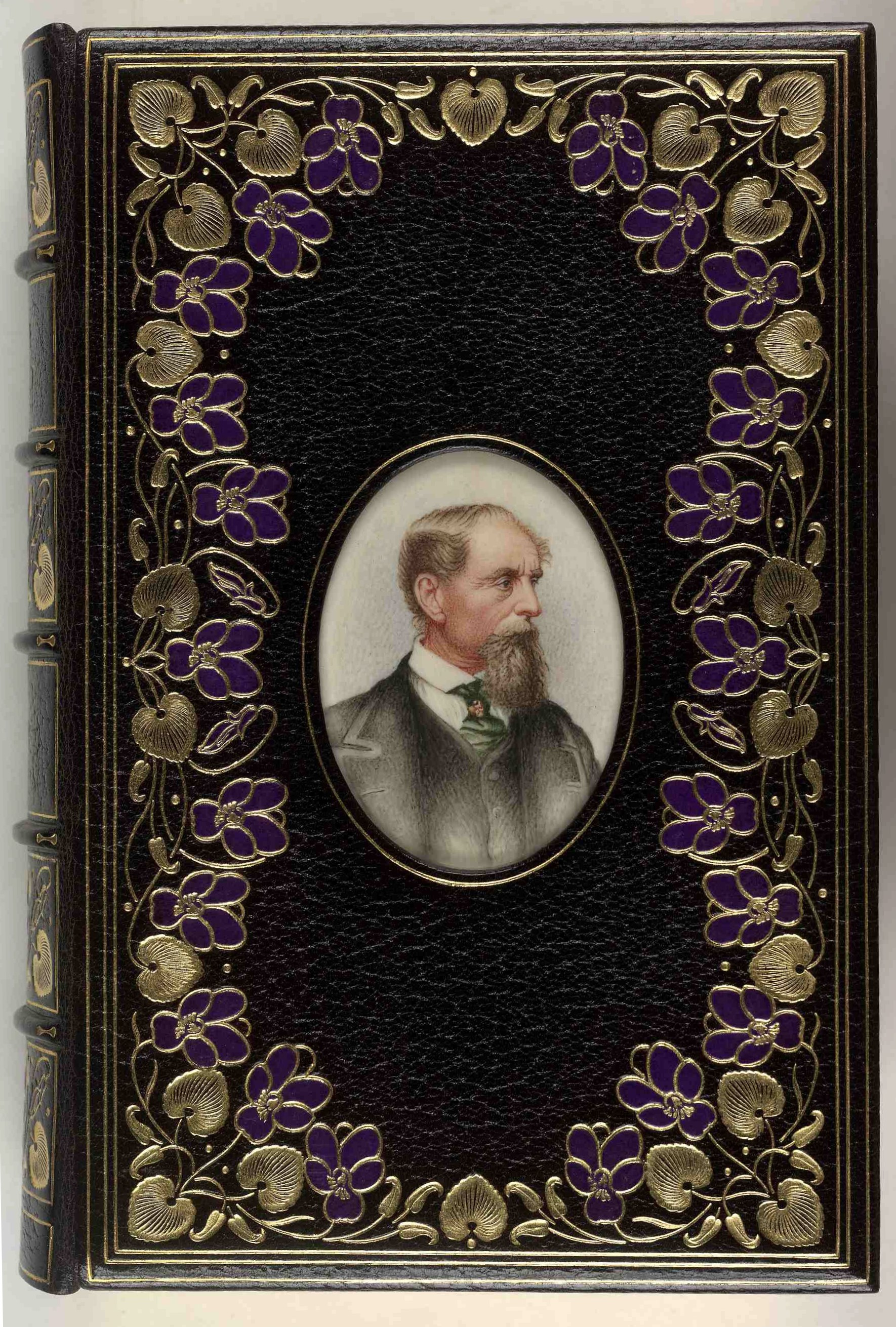
Copy of Little Dorrit bound by Bayntun's firm

On 3 June 1901 at Widcombe, Bayntun married Fanny Louise (Louie) Shearn (ABT 1873–1952), with issue:

- Constance Louise Muriel Bayntun (1902–1989)

George Bayntun died on 4 September 1940 in Bath, at the age of 67.

== Legacy ==
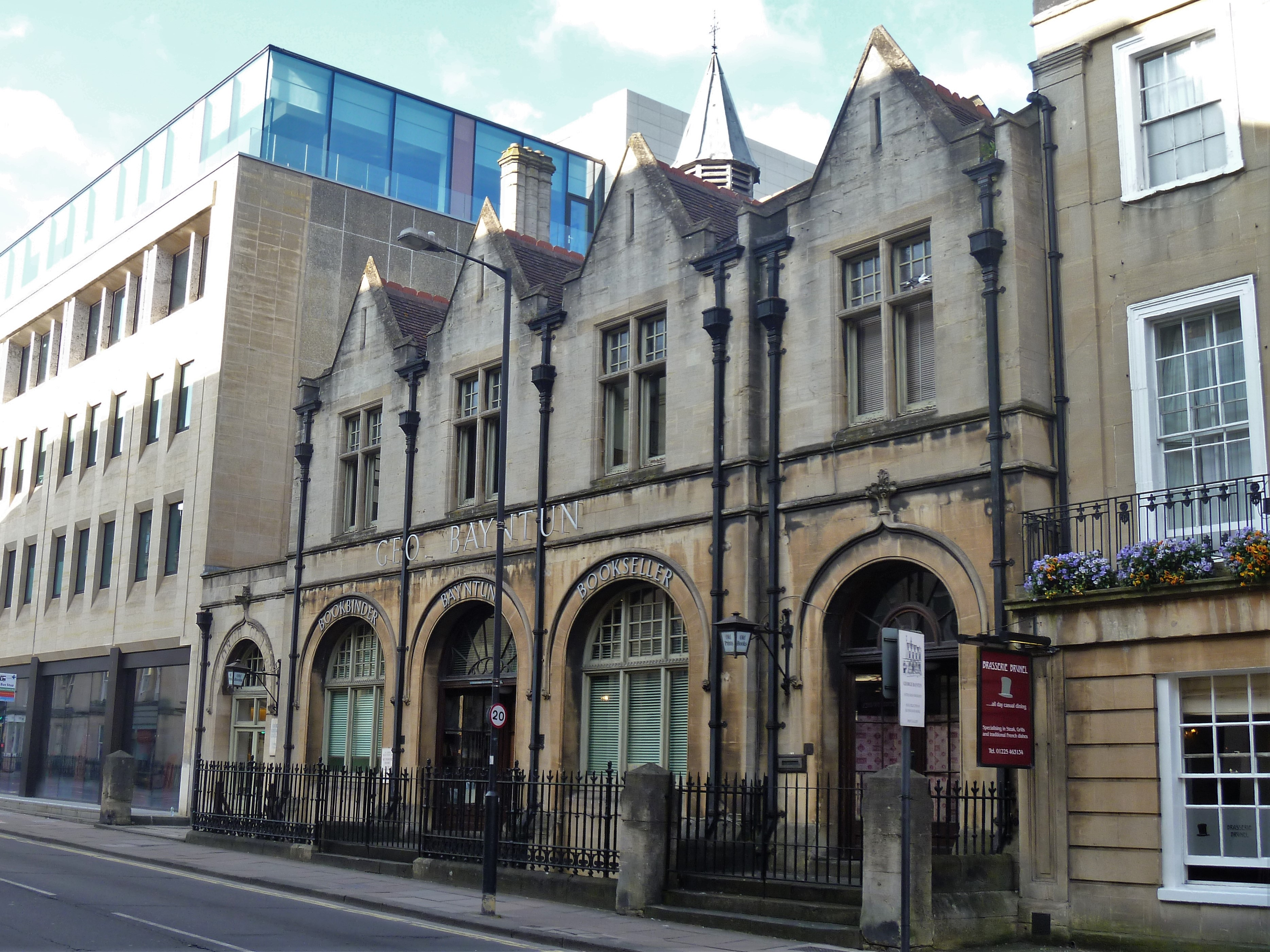
Exterior of George Bayntun's Bookshop, 2018

After George Bayntun's death in 1940, the firm continued under a series of managers and George's only child, Constance, oversaw its continuation. In 1953, she was joined by her son, Hylton Henry Bayntun-Coward (1932–2000), who took over the management in 1954. Hylton served twice as President of the Antiquarian Booksellers Association, and as High Sheriff of Avon. Hylton's widow, Charlotte, owned the bindery business of George Gregory until her death in September 2016.

George Bayntun's company is now owned by Hylton's son, Edward Bayntun-Coward (1966–) who is George Bayntun's great-grandson. Educated at Marlborough College and University College, Oxford, Edward worked for five years at Maggs Bros Ltd in Berkeley Square, London. He has served as Chairman of the Bath Preservation Trust and in March 2016 he was appointed as High Sheriff of Somerset.

== Ancestors ==
Ancestors of George Bayntun

1. Charles Edwin George Bayntun (1873–1940)
48. Edward Rolt (1684–1722)
24. Edward Bayntun-Rolt (1710–1800)
49. Anne Bayntun (1689–1734)
12. Andrew Bayntun-Rolt (1755–1816)
25. Mary Poynter (1718–99)
6. Wilmot Robert Bayntun Power (1801–89)
13. Anne Power (1781–1844)
3. Constance Amelia Bayntun (1838–1921)
7. Elizabeth Camplin (1802–88)
