= Calcutts Ironworks =

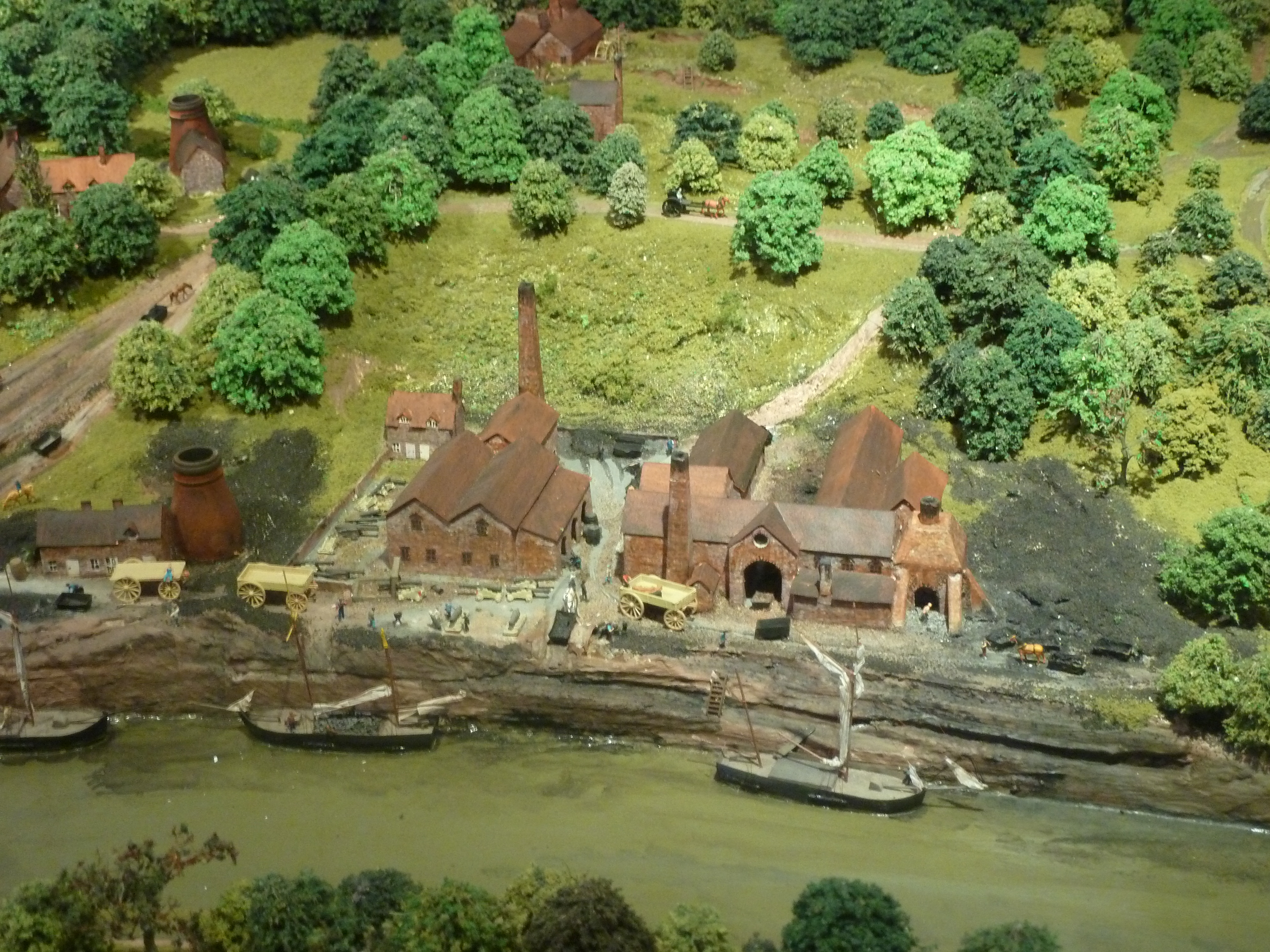
Model of Calcutts Ironworks, part of a diorama of Ironbridge Gorge

Calcutts Ironworks was an ironworks in Jackfield, in Shropshire, England. It was established in 1767, and production ceased in 1828. The works became an important producer of cannon.

== Location ==
The site was on the River Severn, in Ironbridge Gorge about 1 mile (1.6 km) east of Ironbridge. The location is grid reference SJ 686 031 (52°37′31″N 2°27′53″W).

== History ==
In 1767 George Matthews leased the site from Sir Onesiphorus Paul, and he built two furnaces, the bellows being operated by water wheels; the site produced pig iron. In 1778 Matthews was one of a partnership.

By 1786, when the operators were Baille, Pocock and Co., the site had two blast furnaces, which could each produce 40 tons of iron a week, air furnaces, two bar iron forges and three steam engines. The site manufactured cannon.

In that year the lease was bought by Alexander Brodie, a Scottish blacksmith from London. He closed the forge; in the foundry he produced mainly a ship's stove (his patent design) and cannon. By 1796 he was making 32-pounder cannon, and by about 1804 there were four furnaces. It was one of only three sites in the country with a steam-powered boring mill; cannons were bored eleven at a time. They were shipped to Bristol, for naval use. This was the period of the Napoleonic Wars; the site was visited by William V, Prince of Orange during a tour of Shropshire.

Brodie died in 1811, and his nephew, also Alexander Brodie, took over. By 1815 the works had fallen into disrepair. About 1817 the works was leased by William Hazledine, and he produced iron unprofitably for a few years. The last furnace was closed in 1828. He gave up the lease in 1831; the foundry was demolished in 1836.

== See also ==
- Museum of the Gorge, Ironbridge
- Naval artillery in the Age of Sail
