= Spye Park =

Former country estate in Wiltshire, England

Coordinates: 51.4046°N 2.0721°W

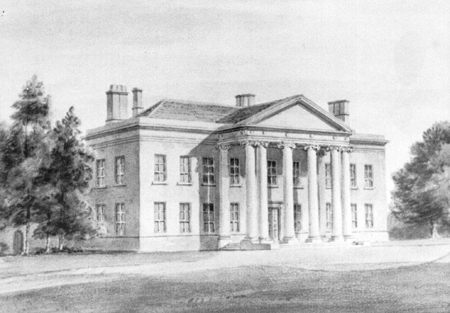
Spye Park, the Palladian mansion in the 18th century

Spye Park is a former country estate in Bromham parish in Wiltshire, England. It lies north of Chittoe, about 1.5 miles (2.4 km) north-west of Bromham village and 2.5 miles (4 km) east of Lacock. The historic house which stood there, near the Roman road from London to Bath, had been twice destroyed by fire, most recently in 1974. The new owner, as of 2005, was planning to rebuild a Palladian house.

Also in the area, at grid reference ST952674, is a 90.3 hectare biological Site of Special Scientific Interest.

== History of Spye Park House ==
The house was first known to be owned in the 16th century by Edward Baynton (1517–1593) of Rowdon; he had previously been Battle Abbey Steward and bought Bromham manor in 1538. To build Bromham Hall he used material salvaged from Devizes Castle and a royal manor house at Corsham.

His grandson Sir Edward Baynton (1593–1657) built Spye Park House after the destruction of Bromham House in 1645 during the Civil War. He was married to Stuarta, the daughter of Sir Thomas Thynne, whose brother resided at Longleat. The house passed out of the Bayntun family when the heiress Ann Baynton married Edward Rolt (d. 1722), of Sacombe Park, MP for Chippenham. Anne (b. 1689) succeeded her brother John Bayntun (1688–1716) who was the 19th in lineal descent from Sir Henry Baynton, Knight of the Household to King Henry II. On his death, the Bayntun male line died out entirely. The two siblings were children of Henry Bayntun (1664–1691) by his wife Lady Anne Wilmot, daughter of John Wilmot, Earl of Rochester, the noted Restoration poet and libertine. Ann Baynton's first husband Edward Rolt (d. 1722) was the son of Sir Thomas Rolt (1632–1710), an early nabob who made his fortune with the East India Company. Sir Thomas purchased the medieval house and estate of Sacombe Park in Hertfordshire in 1688. Ann Rolt, née Bayntun, had several children with her first husband, and at his death, she married in 1724 the 13th Lord Somerville and had further issue, two sons and one daughter. Ann's second son Edward Rolt, later Edward Bayntun-Rolt (d. 1800), inherited the property, and was made a baronet in 1762 (see Bayntun-Rolt baronets). He had six illegitimate children with his mistress, Mary Poynter, whom he later married secretly in 1751. Their fourth and youngest son Sir Andrew Bayntun-Rolt, 2nd Baronet (1755–1816) was born after the marriage and thus was his father's only legitimate child and heir after the marriage laws reforms of 1753. He married in 1777 Lady Maria Coventry, and separated from her for an affair with his nephew in 1783; they divorced in 1787.

Their only child was Maria Barbara Baynton (b. ca 1780). She became her father's and grandfather's sole legitimate heiress as declared in the entail of 1788. Sir Andrew Bayntun-Rolt, 2nd Bt., remarried, but had no male issue apparently. The second page implies that Maria Barbara was his eldest daughter, and perhaps his only living child or his eldest living daughter in 1788. She in turn eloped in 1797 aged 17, and married a mere reverend; however, she inherited her father's estate in 1816. Her son John Edward Andrew Bayntun Starky (1799–1843) inherited the estate, which was sold in 1864 to pay the debts of his son John Bayntun Starky (1834–1872) – while his grandmother, the second heiress, was still alive.

In 1864, the house was bought for £100,000 by Major J.W.G. Spicer, an army officer whose investment in a brewery had made his fortune. The Prince of Wales, later King Edward VII, had offered three times as much, but was refused by the owner John Baynton Starkey for reasons unknown. The house was in the Spicer family's hands for a further four generations. Spicer demolished the 17th-century house, and rebuilt during 1864–1868 in red brick. It was considered an eyesore by Spicer's neighbours. The house was destroyed by fire in 1868, and then rebuilt by 1871, but this time in mock-Tudor style. By 1939, the estate consisted of 500 acres (2.0 km^{2}).

In the 1930s, the owner was Captain Frank Fitzroy Spicer, DSO, MC (d. 1973), who in 1931 married (as her second husband) Lady Avice Sackville-West (b. 1897), younger daughter of the 8th Earl De La Warr. Lady Avice was the former wife of the future MI5 head Stewart Menzies (d. 1968) and left him for Spicer. Despite this, Spicer and his wife were close friends of Queen Elizabeth the Queen Mother who visited Spye Park estate regularly in the 1950s.

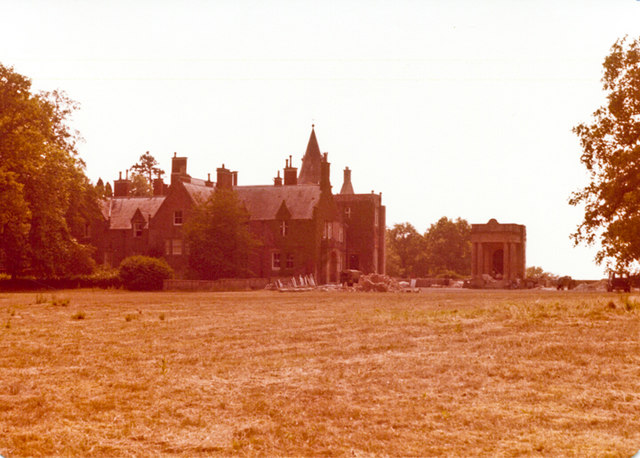
Spye House in the 1970s

The second house built by Major Spicer, the first of five generations of Spicers, was destroyed by fire in 1974. Today, no trace of the great Spye Park mansion exists; even the foundations have been covered over with grass. According to a local history website,

the Spicers decided to tear down the ruin as it was riddled with dry rot, which was worsened by the drenching which the house received from the firemen's hoses.

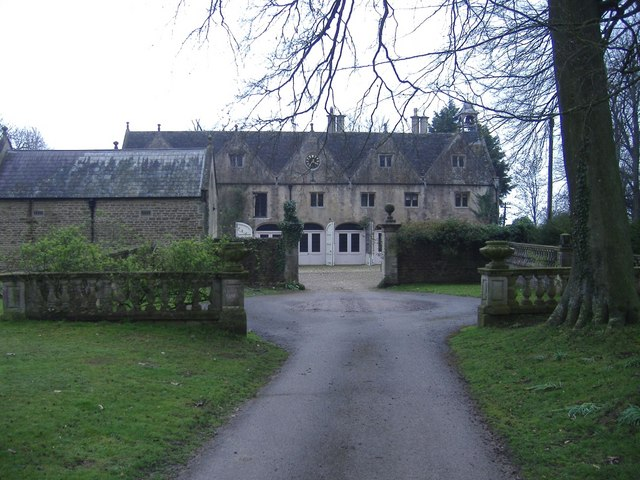
Spye Park Stables

The estate was sold by Simon and Rosamund Spicer, the fifth generation of the family residing there, to the Enthoven family of South Africa. Members of the family own the casual dining chain Nando's and the Hollard Group of insurance companies.

== Owners of the estate since the Restoration ==
=== Bayntun family ===
The house was owned by Bayntuns since the 15th century. Sir Edward Bayntun (1517–1597) built the new house circa 1554, and married a Howard relative Agnes Ryce (d. 1574), formerly the mistress of a nobleman Lord Stourton (d. 1548). Their descendants held the house and estate until 1864 when both passed out of the family. Sir Edward was a Member of Parliament for Wiltshire County in 1562–1563 and again in 1570; M.P. for Devizes in 1571; M.P. for Calne in 1572 and M.P. for Chippenham Borough in 1588–1589 and High Sheriff of Wiltshire in 1570. His first wife's mother Lady Katherine Howard (d. 1554), was a half-aunt of one of Henry VIII's wives – Anne Boleyn and stepmother of another, Katherine Howard; she was daughter of the 2nd Duke by his second wife Agnes Tilney; Anne Boleyn and Katherine Howard were his granddaughters by his first wife Elizabeth Tilney (cousin of Agnes). However, her husband was Rhys FitzUryan.

- 1654–1679: Sir Edward Bayntun (1618–1679), KB, Sheriff of Wiltshire in 1664. He married aged 43 the 18-year-old Stuarta Thynne (d. 1680), daughter of Sir Thomas Thynne, and sister of Thomas Thynne murdered at the connivance of Karl Johann von Königsmarck, more famous in history as the brother of Philip Christoph von Königsmarck, lover of the future George I's wife, and Aurora von Königsmarck, mistress of the King of Poland and Elector of Saxony, and ancestress of George Sand. They were estranged by 1670. In his will expressly forbade interference by his wife and her relations, a powerful Wiltshire family, in his children's education and upbringing. His younger surviving son Thomas Bayntun (1667–1713) was father of Rachael Bayntun, Duchess of Kingston.
- 1679–1691: Henry Bayntun (1664–1691) married 1685 Lady Anne Wilmot (d. 1703 as Lady Anne Greville), daughter of the late Earl of Rochester (d.1680 aged 33), famous Restoration poet-libertine.
- 1691–1716: John Bayntun (1688–1716), who died sine prole.

At his death, the Baynton male line failed. His sister Ann inherited, but by terms of an entail in 1716 and customary inheritance laws, her second son Edward inherited from his uncle.

=== Bayntun-Rolt baronets (1726–1816) ===
- 1716–1800: Sir Edward Bayntun-Rolt, 1st Bt. (d. 1800), created a baronet 1762, inherited from his uncle John Bayntun
- 1800–1816: Sir Andrew Bayntun-Rolt, 2nd Bt. (1755–1816); died without legitimate sons. His eldest daughter inherited the estate.

=== Bayntun-Starkey family (1816–1864) ===
Estate inherited by Maria Barbara Bayntun Starkey (1780–1870), apparently passed by entail or other provision to her son.

- 1816–1841: John Bayntun Starkey (d. 1841).
- 1841–1864: John Andrew Bayntun Starkey; sold the house in 1855 and the estate in 1864, per various sources.

=== Spicer family (1864–2005) ===
- 1864–1883: Major J.W.G. Spicer
- in 1888: Captain John Spicer "Hunt: in 1888, the eighth Duke of Beaufort loaned the country to Captain John Spicer of Spye Park, who hunted it until the present formation of the hunt in 1912. Former masters include Sir Gerald and Sir John Fuller, Viscount Knutsford, Major John Bartholomew, Charles Bartholomew and Captain Frank Spicer".
- in 1930s and 1950s: Captain Frank Fitzroy Spicer DSO MC (d. 1973)
- in 1974: Simon Spicer, fifth-generation owner who sold the park in 2005.

=== Enthoven family (2005–present) ===
- The Enthoven family are businesspeople, originally from South Africa.

== Site of Special Scientific Interest ==
Spye Park is also the name of a biological Site of Special Scientific Interest, first notified in 1951. It is a mosaic of six partly wooded areas, in total 223 acres (90 ha), including "some of the finest undisturbed alderwoods in the county". It is notable for its trees, diverse ground flora and epiphytic lichens, and is home to woodland birds.

== Sources ==
- History of Spye Park
- History of the Bayntun family and their marriages
