= Sir Edward Bayntun-Rolt, 1st Baronet =

British landowner and Whig politician

Sir Edward Bayntun-Rolt 1st Baronet, of Sacombe and Spye Park

Member of Parliament for Chippenham

Personal details
- Born: Edward Rolt; 1710 Sacombe, Hertfordshire
- Died: 3 January 1800
- Resting place: St Nicholas Church, Bromham, Wiltshire
- Citizenship: British
- Spouse: Mary Poynter
- Parents: Edward Rolt; Anne Bayntun
- Occupation: Landowner, politician

Sir Edward Bayntun-Rolt, 1st Baronet (1710–1800) was a British landowner and Whig politician who sat in the House of Commons for 43 years from 1737 to 1780. His election in 1741 was instrumental in the downfall of Sir Robert Walpole's premiership.

== Early life ==
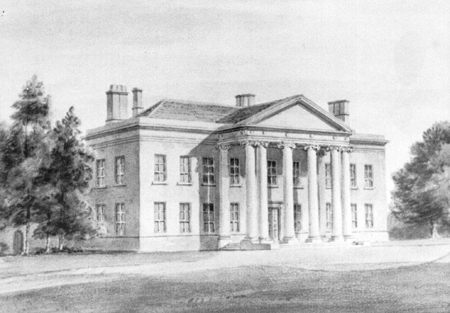
Spye Park, palladian mansion

Bayntun-Rolt was the second son of Edward Rolt of Sacombe, Hertfordshire and his wife Anne Bayntun, daughter of Henry Bayntun of Spye Park. Following the death of his uncle John Bayntun, he succeeded to the Bayntun properties at Spye Park and elsewhere in 1717, and took the additional name of Bayntun.

== Political career ==
Bayntun-Rolt's estate brought him a major interest in the parliamentary seat at Chippenham. He was returned as an opposition Whig Member of Parliament at a by-election on 22 June 1737. At the 1741 general election he was re-elected with Sir Edmond Thomas, another opposition candidate, after a contest against two government candidates. The two defeated government candidates petitioned and the outcome became a trial of strength between Sir Robert Walpole and his opponents. On 31 January 1742 the petition was rejected by 16 votes. This event led to Walpole's resignation after 20 years as prime minister.

Bayntun-Rolt was appointed a groom of the bedchamber to Frederick, Prince of Wales in 1745 but was dismissed in March 1746. At the 1747 general election he was given a secret service grant of £800 towards his expenses. After the Prince of Wales's death in 1751, he was made surveyor general to the Duchy of Cornwall at £466 a year and held the post for forty-five years.

Bayntun-Rolt was again given a secret service grant at the 1754 general election and in 1761, although the Government granted no money for elections, the Earl of Bute arranged a pension of £300 on the Duchy of Cornwall for him. He was created baronet on 7 July 1762. He was returned again as MP for Chippenham in 1768 and 1774. He did not stand in the 1780 general election.

== Family life and legacy ==
Bayntun-Rolt married Mary Poynter (1718–99) of Herriard, Hampshire before 1743, and again 15 January 1750 at Parish Church, Shoreham, Kent, with issue:

- Andrew Bayntun-Rolt (1755–1816), 2nd and last Baronet
- Elizabeth Bayntun-Rolt (1758–98), who married Henry Stone

Mary died 26 March 1799 at Spye Park.

Bayntun-Rolt died on 3 January 1800. He was succeeded in the baronetcy by his son Andrew.

A memorial exists in St Nicholas' Church, Bromham, Wiltshire.

== Ancestors ==
Ancestors of Sir Edward Bayntun-Rolt, 1st Baronet

8. Edward Rolt
4. Thomas Rolt (ABT 1631-1710)
36. Henry Williams (alias Cromwell) (1537–1604)
18. Sir Oliver Cromwell (ABT 1562-1655)
37. Joan Warren (d. 1584)
9. Mary Cromwell (died 1634)
38. Gillis Hooftman (1521-81)
19. Anne Hooftman
39. Margaretha van Nispen (1545-98)
2. Edward Rolt (ABT 1684-1722)
10. Thomas Coxe (1615-85)
5. Mary Cox (died 1716)
1. Edward Bayntun-Rolt (1710-1800)
48. Sir Henry Bayntun
24. Edward Bayntun (1593-1657)
49. Lucy Danvers
12. Edward Bayntun (1618–1679)
50. Henry Maynard (1547–1610)
25. Elizabeth Maynard
51. Susan Pearson
6. Henry Bayntun (1664-91)
52. Thomas Thynne (ABT 1578-1639)
26. Thomas Thynne (c.1610-69)
53. Maria Touchet
13. Stuarta Thynne (1643-80)
54. Walter Balcanquhall (ABT 1586-1645)
27. Stuarta Balcanquhall
55. Elizabeth Aucher
3. Anne Bayntun (1689-1734)
56. Charles Wilmot (ABT 1562-1644)
28. Henry Wilmot (1612-58)
57. Sarah Anderson (died 1615)
14. John Wilmot (1647-80)
58. John St John (1585–1648)
29. Anne St John (1614-96)
59. Anne Leighton (d. 1628)
7. Anne Wilmot
60. John Malet (ABT 1573-1644)
30. John Malet (died 1656)
61. Anne Tracy (died 1670)
15. Elizabeth Malet (1651-81)
62. Francis Hawley (1608-84)
31. Unton Hawley (died 1698)
63. Jane Gibbes

Parliament of Great Britain
Preceded by Rogers Holland; Richard Long	Member of Parliament for Chippenham; 1737–1780; With: Richard Long; Sir Edmond Thomas 1741–1754; Sir Samuel Fludyer 1754–1768; Sir Thomas Fludyer 1768–1769; Henry Dawkins 1769–1774; Samuel Marsh 1774–1780	Succeeded by Henry Dawkins; Giles Hudson
Baronetage of Great Britain
New creation	Baronet (of Spye Park); 1762–1800	Succeeded by Andrew Bayntun-Rolt
