= John St Leger Douglas =

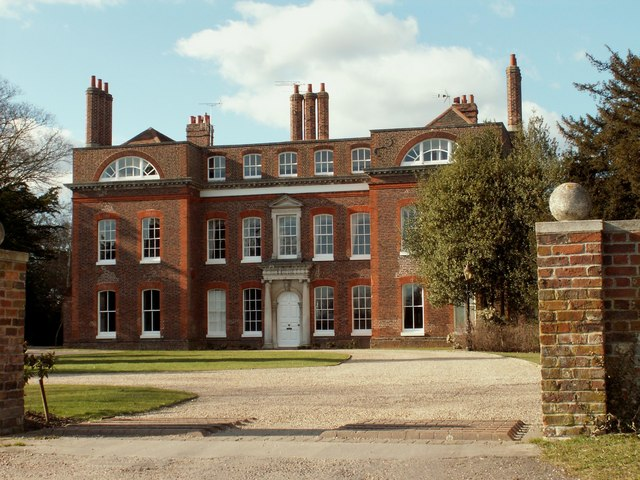
Springfield Place, Chelmsford, Essex

John St. Leger Douglas (c. 1732 – 23 May 1783) was an 18th-century member of the House of Commons of Great Britain. He owned Springfield Place, near Chelmsford, Essex.

== Early life and education ==
Douglas was the eldest son of John St. Leger Douglas, a West Indian plantation owner, and his wife, Susannah, daughter of Michael Lambert, Deputy-Governor of St Kitts. He was a grandson of Col. Walter Douglas of Baads, Midlothian, Governor of the Leeward Islands. He was educated at Westminster School (1743), aged 10, and at Trinity College, Cambridge (1748). He succeeded his father in 1747.

== Career ==
He was Member of Parliament for Hindon from 1769, at a time when bribery was the norm in this constituency, until 1774, and Member of Parliament for Weobley 1774 – 23 May 1783, when he died. In his only recorded speech in the House of Commons, he supported the Government against the interests of the West Indies even after the outbreak of war against America in 1775, declaring that he too 'had a considerable estate in the West Indies'.

He bought Springfield Place in Chelmsford and improved the grounds. He bred racehorses, including the undefeated thoroughbred Goldfinder.

== Family ==
Douglas was twice married, having children by both wives. His daughter Charlotte married her cousin Admiral John Leigh Douglas (1741–1810).

On his death in 1783 he left his estates in St Kitts in trust for his son William Douglas and his other properties and personal estate on trust to his brother Lieutenant-colonel James Douglas to provide cash amounts for his other children on their majority.

Parliament of Great Britain
| Preceded by Simon Luttrell; Bamber Gascoyne | Member of Parliament for Weobley; With: William Lynch 1774–1780; Andrew Bayntun-Rolt 1780–1783 | Succeeded by Andrew Bayntun-Rolt (Sir) John Scott |
