= Museum of the Gorge, Ironbridge =

Museum in Ironbridge, Shropshire, England

Coordinates: 52°37′46.23″N 2°29′31.93″W

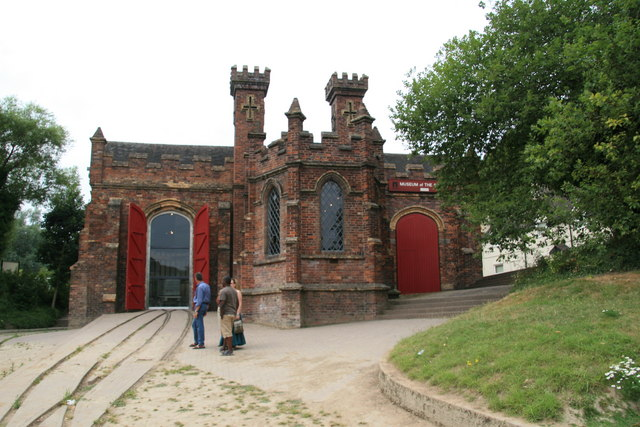
The water frontage of the warehouse building

The Museum of the Gorge, originally the Severn Warehouse, is managed by the National Trust and is one of the ten museums to be acquired from the Ironbridge Gorge Museum Trust in 2026. It portrays the history of the Ironbridge Gorge and the surrounding area of Coalbrookdale, Shropshire, England.

== History ==
The River Severn was a major transport route, especially before the building of the railway. Severn trows were used to bring raw materials to the forges of the Gorge and to take the finished goods away. At this time, before the management of the river by weirs, water levels in the Severn were highly seasonal. During the summer the river was too low to be navigable and so finished goods were held in warehouses until there was once again enough water for passage.

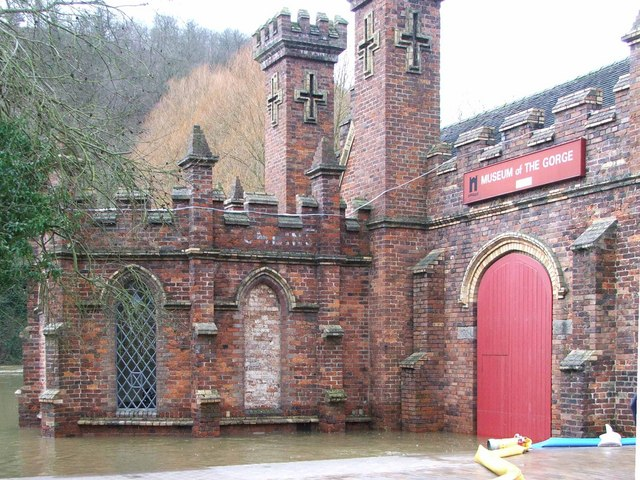
Flooding in 2008

The site is at the Wharfage, just west of the village of Ironbridge. This location is also the confluence of the main manufacturing area of Coalbrookdale, and its non-navigable river, with the valley of the Severn.

Around 1840 a warehouse was constructed here for the Coalbrookdale Company, to plans by the architect Samuel Cookson. Its architectural style is highly distinctive and most unusual for a warehouse. It follows the Gothic Revival architecture recently made fashionable by Pugin and already made use of locally for St Luke's Church, Ironbridge. St Luke's is in the simple Commissioners' Gothic style, by local architect Samuel Smith of Madeley. That style is close to the original medieval Gothic and follows Pugin's ideas. The style of the warehouse owes far more to Horace Walpole's Strawberry Hill than to Pugin. The parapet of the roof is crenellated at each end and decorated with pinnacles. The Eastward, riverward face is extended with a church-like apse, flanked by two narrow towers decorated with cross-shaped arrow loops, but actually hiding chimneys. Construction is of local red brick, with yellow brick dressing. The main roof is simple and warehouse-like, comprising four tiled bays with simple gable ends. Most of the walls are blind, with only high windows in the gables for security and the walls between supported by buttresses. The apse extension, originally an office, has tall lancet windows to give light, and reinforcing the church-like atmosphere of that facade.

The warehouse is Grade II* listed. The sandstone walls of the 1780s wharf extend for half a mile between the warehouse and the Iron Bridge; they are also listed at Grade II.

Various small narrow gauge tramways were used around Coalbrookdale. The short distance from the doors of the warehouse to the river basin is crossed by plateway grooves for unflanged wheels, set directly into the paving of the wharf.

Later warehouses were built to the west, adjoining this building and what is now the museum car park. These have since been used for light industry and retail purposes. At one time they housed the Merrythought teddy bear factory, makers of Mr Whoppit and other bears.

=== Flooding ===
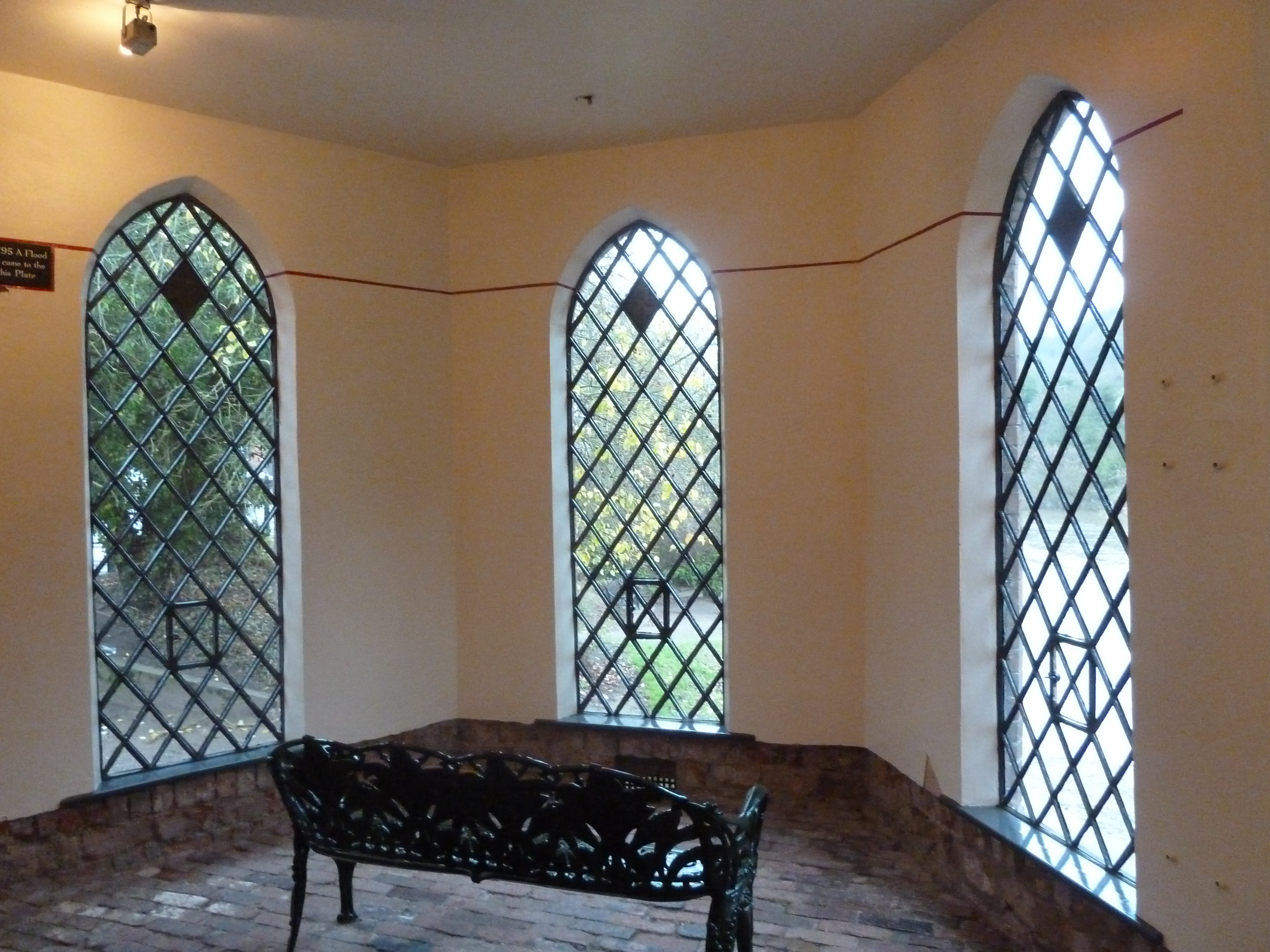
Highest flood level, shown in the line painted near the top of the windows

Flooding has long been a problem for this stretch of the river. Flooding to the level of the warehouse is an annual occurrence. The worst of the floods is recorded by a painted line inside the building, almost at the top of the windows.

== Museum ==
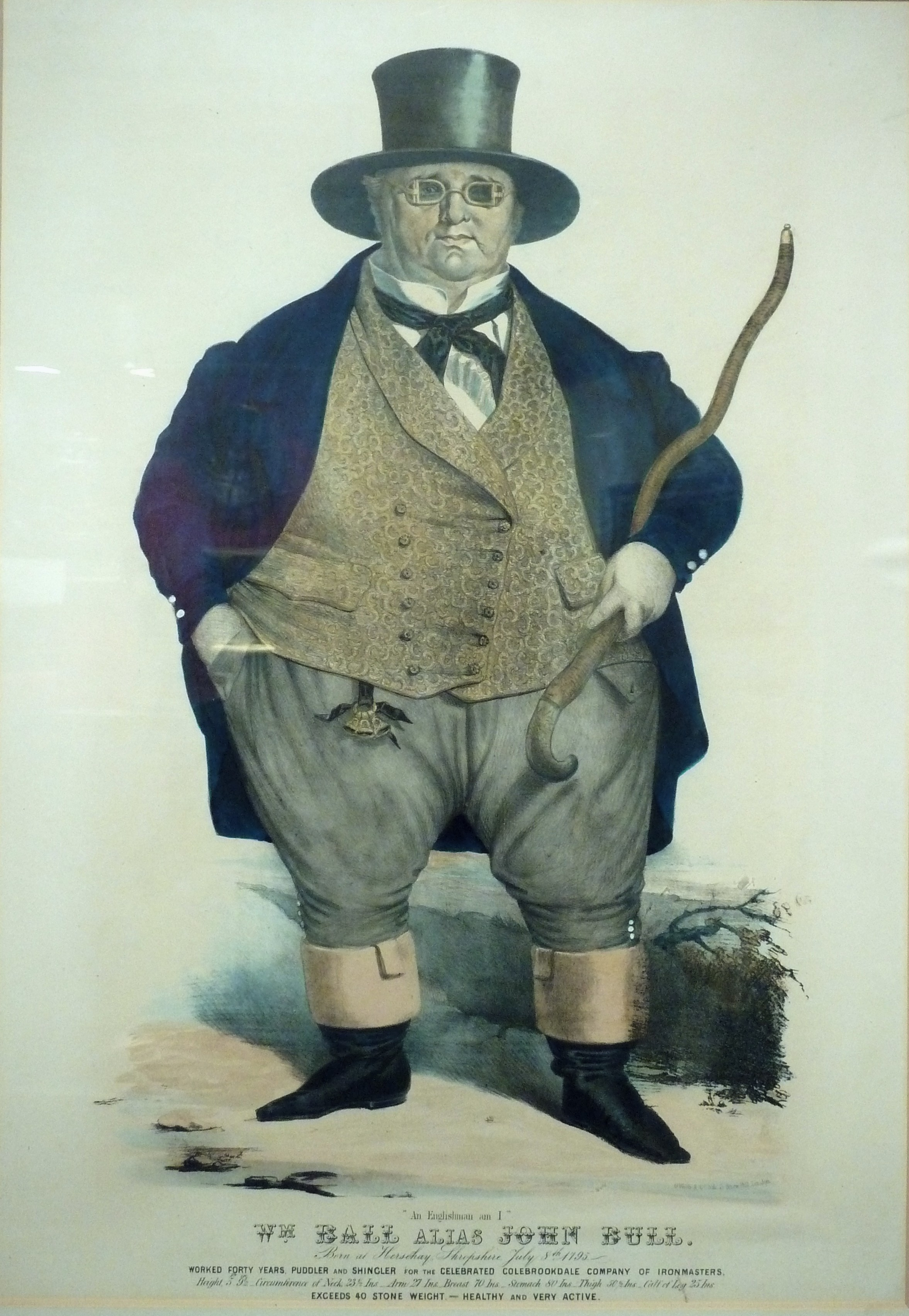
William Ball the "Shropshire Giant", of Horsehay. Born in 1795, he weighed over 40 stone yet was so fit and active that he worked as a wrought iron puddler and shingler, an infamously hard-working job.

The museum's main function is to explain the overall picture of the Ironbridge Gorge sites. Films and interactive displays help to do this.

There are relatively few exhibits specific to the warehouse building itself. Examples are displayed of the kind of iron wares that were cast by the Coalbrookdale Company, and that would have been shipped through the warehouse.

=== Diorama ===
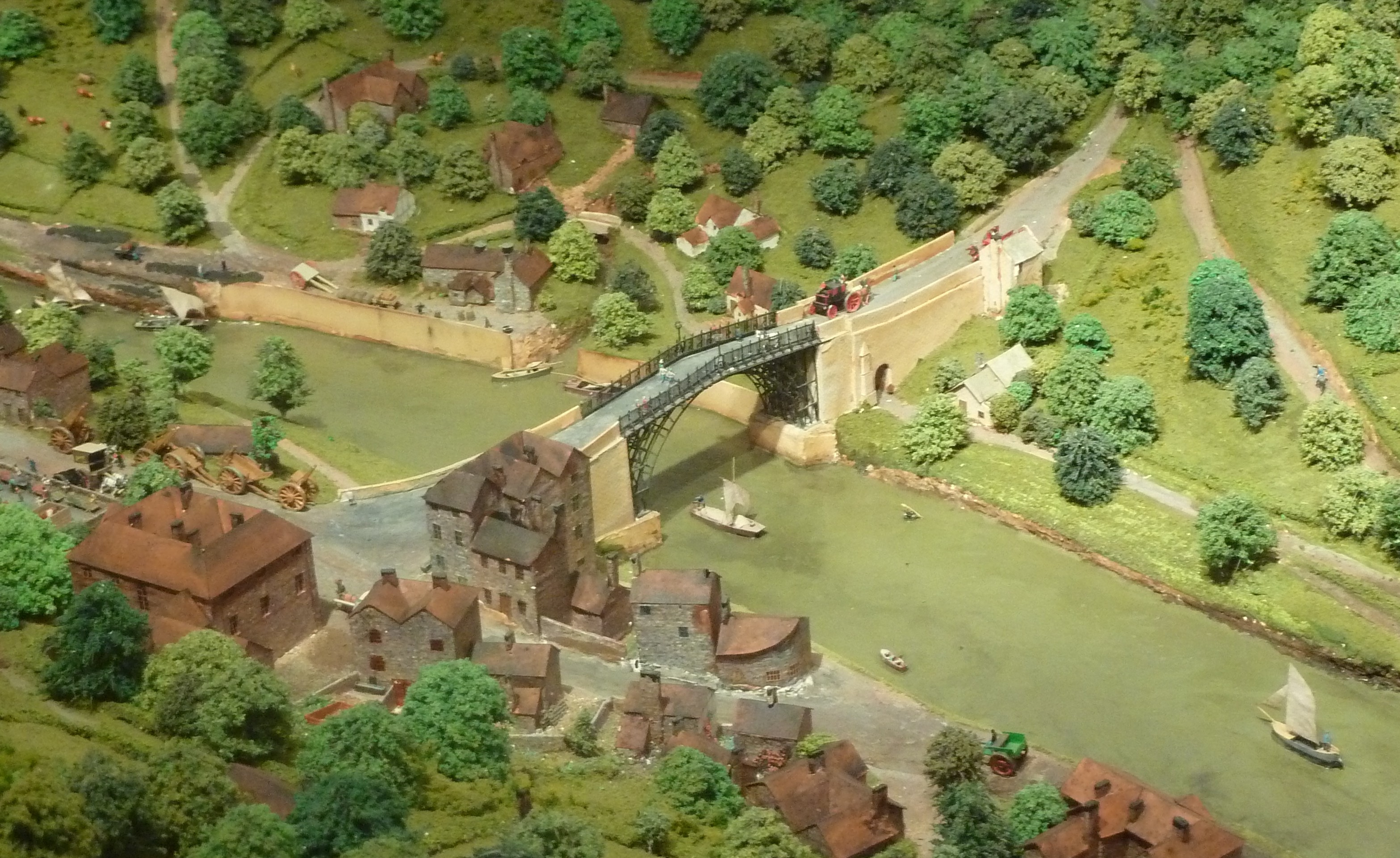
The Iron Bridge in the centre of the diorama

The centrepiece of the museum is a large diorama, 12 metres (40 ft) long. This represents the whole of the Gorge, as it was at its industrial height.

The diorama represents the visit of King George III to the Iron Bridge itself, in 1796. The bridge, opened in 1781, was now 15 years old. This was the period of the Napoleonic Wars and the First Coalition. At this time Britain was still at war with France, although not as actively engaged as it would be shortly. The industries of the Gorge were militarily important, although under the Quaker ironmasters of the Darby family the foundries of Coalbrookdale were not directly engaged in the casting of cannon, as other ironworks such as the Calcutts Ironworks in Jackfield (shown on the diorama) and the more famous Scottish Carron Company were.

In the early part of the Industrial Revolution the Gorge contained a larger number of smaller furnaces than it would in later years. Many establishments were small and in particular there were a large number of shallow bell pits extracting coal. These used horse gins for winding, models of which can be seen. Steam power is rare at this time, only a few of the larger furnaces having steam blowing engines.

One of the largest sections of the diorama is the 350 yards (320 m) long Hay Inclined Plane of the Shropshire Canal, opened in 1792. Although mostly gravity worked, this also used an early Heslop patent rotative beam engine to winch canal tubs from the canal basin at the top. At the foot of the inclined plane is the short Coalport Canal and the newly opened Coalport China manufactory (1795) with its four bottle kilns.

The Gorge site and its museums are a large destination for any visitor. The diorama provides a convenient viewpoint to gain an overall view of the several sites and an aid to planning a trip around them. Although the museum is otherwise one of the smaller ones of the Trust, the diorama and other displays here are useful at the start of a larger visit as an overview and context for the other sites.

== See also ==
- Listed buildings in The Gorge
