= Bayntun-Rolt baronets =

Arms of Bayntun-Rolt of Spye Park

The Bayntun-Rolt Baronetcy, of Spye Park in the County of Wiltshire, was a title in the Baronetage of Great Britain. It was created on 7 July 1762 for Edward Bayntun-Rolt, for many years Member of Parliament for Chippenham.

He was born Edward Rolt, the grandson of Sir Thomas Rolt and Anne Bayntun, daughter of Henry Bayntun, of Spye Park, Calne, Wiltshire. In 1717 he assumed by royal licence the additional surname of Bayntun after inheriting the estates of his great-uncle, John Bayntun.

The 2nd Baronet, his only legitimate son, sat as Member of Parliament for Weobly, Herefordshire. He had no surviving male issue and the title became extinct on his death in 1816.

== Bayntun-Rolt baronets, of Spye Park (1762) ==
- Sir Edward Bayntun-Rolt, 1st Baronet (1710–1800)
- Sir Andrew Bayntun-Rolt, 2nd Baronet (c. 1740–1816)

Baronetage of Great Britain
Preceded by Delaval baronets	Bayntun-Rolt baronets of Spye Park; 7 July 1762	Succeeded by Paul baronets
