= Listed buildings in The Gorge =

The Gorge is a civil parish in the district of Telford and Wrekin, Shropshire, England. It contains 215 listed buildings that are recorded in the National Heritage List for England. Of these, two are listed at Grade I, the highest of the three grades, 13 are at Grade II*, the middle grade, and the others are at Grade II, the lowest grade. The River Severn runs through the parish and, together with a tributary running from the north, form Ironbridge Gorge, which contains the town of Ironbridge, and the villages of Coalbrookdale, Coalport and part of Jackfield.

Until the coming of the Industrial Revolution the parish was rural, and the listed buildings from this period consist of timber framed houses and cottages. In 1708 Abraham Darby I moved to Coalbrookdale and took over a disused blast furnace. He developed this into The Old Furnace in which he smelted iron with coke for the first time in the world in 1709. From this, Coalbrookdale Ironworks developed and a number of buildings associated with it are listed. The iron for The Iron Bridge at Ironbridge, the first major bridge in the world to be built from cast iron in 1777–80, was smelted at Coalbrookdale, to be followed soon by Coalport Bridge in 1780; both bridges are listed. These bridges and some of the surviving strictures associated with the early iron industry are also Scheduled Monuments.

Following the construction of The Old Bridge, the town of Ironbridge grew, and many of the listed buildings in the town are houses, shops and other buildings constructed in the late 18th century and the early 19th century. Apart from structures associated with the iron industry, houses, cottages, and shops, the other listed buildings in the parish include public houses and hotels, churches, chapels and schools, structures associated with the wharf at Ironbridge, toll houses, Coalport China works, public buildings, a burial ground, warehouses, more bridges, level crossing gates, a former workhouse, lamp posts, a war memorial, and a telephone kiosk.

== Key ==
Grade	Criteria
I	Buildings of exceptional interest, sometimes considered to be internationally important
II*	Particularly important buildings of more than special interest
II	Buildings of national importance and special interest

== Buildings ==
Name and location	Photograph	Date	Notes	Grade
Wards Tyning; 52.61555°N 2.44416°W		c. 16th century	Originally a hall house, it is timber framed with painted infill and a tile roof. There are two storeys and five or six bays. The windows are casements, and at the rear are five gables and an outshut.	II
68 Bower Yard; 52.62694°N 2.48509°W		Late 16th century	A timber framed house with painted brick infill, sprocket eaves, and a tile roof. There is a single storey with an attic, and a single-storey stone outbuilding on the left. The doorway has a plain surround and a hood, and the windows are casements.	II
The Lodge; 52.63080°N 2.48399°W	—	16th or 17th century	A house later divided into two with two ranges. The west range is in sandstone, partly rendered, and has a tile roof. There are two storeys and an attic, the south end is gabled on two sides with circular openings in the gables. The windows are casements and there is one gabled dormer. The east range is at right angles, and is in brick possibly with a timber framed core, and has two storeys and an attic. There is a 19th-century extension to the east.	II
Rose Cottage; 52.63346°N 2.49118°W		1642	A timber framed range of cottages with painted brick infill and a tile roof. There is one storey and attics, five bays, two single-storey lean-tos, and a stone gabled wing on the front. The right bay has a jettied gable and a hood mould. The windows are casements, and there are four gabled dormers.	II*
34 and 35 Belmont Road; 52.62862°N 2.47686°W		17th century	A pair of timber framed cottages, later refronted in brick and rendered, and with a tile roof. There is one storey and attics, and each cottage has two bays. The windows are casements, and each cottage has a gabled dormer.	II
69 Bower Yard; 52.62637°N 2.4856°W	—	17th century	A timber framed cottage, partly roughcast and partly in brick, with sprocket eaves and a tile roof. There is one storey and an attic, and it contains a doorway with a plain surround, a casement window, a small canted oriel window, and a gabled dormer.	II
The Old Furnace, Coalbrookdale Ironworks; 52.64051°N 2.49270°W		Mid 17th century	The blast furnace in which iron was first smelted with coke in 1709 by Abraham Darby I, it was rebuilt in 1777 by Abraham Darby III, and rebuilt again following an explosion in 1810. The furnace consists of a double cone of fire brick and red brick with fire resistant material between them, which is encased by a square tower-like brick structure. There are two recesses, each spanned by an inscribed and dated cast iron beam. The structure is protected by a tent-like structure in steel and glass. The furnace and the surrounding area is a Scheduled Monument.	I
Sycamores; 52.62883°N 2.47484°W		17th century	A house that has been altered and extended. The original part is timber framed, and the front extension is rendered. The roof is tiled, there is one storey and an attic, a double-pile plan, and a single-storey gabled wing on the right. The windows are casements, and there are gabled dormers.	II
Yew Tree Cottage; 52.63036°N 2.49345°W		17th century	A timber framed cottage with plaster infill and a tile roof. There is one storey and an attic, two bays, and a later one-storey extension to the left. The doorway has pilasters and a pediment. This is flanked by casement windows, and there are two more casements above in a wide gable.	II
29 and 30 The Wharfage; 52.62986°N 2.49239°W		Late 17th century (probable)	A pair of cottages that were later altered, they are in stone, roughcast at the front, and with a tile roof, coped on the left. The cottages have one storey and attics, and each has a doorway with a plain surround, a casement window, and a gabled dormer.	II
2 and 3 Upper Severn Terrace; 52.62933°N 2.48880°W		Late 17th or early 18th century	A pair of timber framed houses with timber framing exposed at the rear, and fronted in sandstone with brick dressings. The roof is tiled, there are two storeys, cross-windows on the front and casements at the rear.	II
24 Hodgebower; 52.63005°N 2.48398°W		1714	A brown brick house that has been much altered, with one storey and an attic, a lower single-bay two-storey extension on the left, and a lean-to on the right. In the ground floor are two double French windows, and above are two gabled dormers with a dated and initialed tablet between them.	II
Rosehill House; 52.64139°N 2.49390°W		c. 1720	The house is in painted brick with stone dressings, chamfered quoins, a moulded eaves cornice, a parapet, and a hipped tile roof. There are three storeys and a symmetrical front of five bays. In the centre is a round-headed doorway with a fanlight and a triangular pediment on console brackets, and the windows are sashes.	II*
139 and 142 Salthouse Road; 52.62375°N 2.46315°W		Early 18th century	A painted brick house with a gabled tile roof. There are two storeys, four bays, and rear gabled wings. The doorway has a hood on brackets, and the windows are casements with segmental heads.	II
Braeside; 52.62834°N 2.47707°W	—	Early 18th century	Wings were added later to the cottage. It is in brick and has tile roofs with parapeted gable ends. There are two storeys and an attic.	II
Calcutts House; 52.62413°N 2.46684°W	—	Early 18th century	A red brick house with a moulded stone eaves cornice and a tile roof. There are three storeys and an attic, and three bays. The central doorway has a moulded architrave, panelled reveals, a rectangular fanlight, and a pediment on large shaped brackets. The windows are sashes with keystones and cornices, and there are three gabled dormers with finials.	II
Tea Kettle Row; 52.64150°N 2.49455°W		1735–42	A terrace of painted brick cottages with a string course and a tile roof. There is one storey and nine bays. The windows are two-light mullioned and transomed casements with segmental arched heads, and there are gabled eaves dormers.	II
1 and 2 Bath Road; 52.62819°N 2.48617°W	—	18th century (probable)	A house, later divided into two, in red brick with a sill band, a parapet and a moulded cornice at the front, and modillion eaves elsewhere, and a hipped tile roof. There are two storeys and three bays. The two doorways have pilasters, the right doorway has a blocked fanlight and an open pediment, and the windows are sashes.	II
7 Belle Vue Road; 52.62893°N 2.48326°W	—	18th century	A brick cottage with a dentilled eaves course and a tile roof. There is one storey and an attic, and two bays. The central doorway has a hood on brackets, the windows are casements, and there are two gabled dormers. On the right side is an external chimney stack with offsets.	II
46 Lincoln Hill; 52.63062°N 2.48858°W	—	18th century	A sandstone cottage with a tile roof, two storeys, two bays, and a brick rear wing. There is a central doorway, the windows in the ground floor are mullioned and transomed casements, and in the upper floor they are modern casements.	II
54 New Bridge Road; 52.62824°N 2.47552°W		18th century	A brick cottage with a rendered and roughcast front, a tile roof, one storey and an attic. It contains a small bow window, a window with a cambered head, and two gabled dormers.	II
Outbuilding northeast of 7 New Road; 52.62913°N 2.48801°W		18th century	A small stone building, heightened in brick, with a corrugated iron roof. There are two storeys and a circular plan. Inside, there is a fireplace in each floor, and a recess in the ground floor.	II
11 Tontine Hill; 52.62789°N 2.48559°W		18th century	A stuccoed shop with a tile roof, two storeys and three bays. In the ground floor is a shop front with a segmental-headed passage to the left, and the upper floor contains casement windows. Behind the shop is a large brick chimney stack.	II
6 and 7 The Wharfage; 52.62805°N 2.48714°W	—	18th century	A pair of brick houses with modillion eaves and a tile roof. There are two storeys, the gable end of No. 6 faces the road, and No. 7 has three bays. The doorways have pilasters and fanlights. The windows are sashes with plain lintels, other than the window above the door of No. 7 which has a cambered head and a keyblock.	II
8 The Wharfage; 52.62819°N 2.48716°W	—	18th century	The house is in engraved stucco with a tile roof, three storeys and three bays. The central doorway has a cornice, and the windows are sashes with plain lintels.	II
11 The Wharfage; 52.62839°N 2.48787°W		18th century	A red brick house with a tile roof, two storeys, three bays, and a single-storey extension on the left. The central doorway has pilasters, and the windows are sashes with keyblocks.	II
12–14 The Wharfage; 52.62850°N 2.48814°W		18th century	A row of three red brick houses. Nos. 12 and 13 have three storeys, and No. 14 has three storeys and an attic. No. 12 has a stuccoed ground floor and sash windows, and No. 13 is painted and has casement windows. No. 14 has an L-shaped plan with a projecting gabled bays facing the road. This bay contains a canted oriel window, and elsewhere are sash windows and a gabled dormer.	II
22 and 23 The Wharfage; 52.62962°N 2.49197°W		18th century	A pair of brick cottages, No. 23 rendered, with a dentilled eaves course and a tile roof. There are two storeys and attics, a total of six bays, and both cottages have sash windows and gabled dormers. No. 22 has a doorway with pilasters and an entablature, and No. 23 has a doorway with a hood on brackets.	II
9 and 10 Waterloo Street; 52.62710°N 2.47819°W		18th century	A pair of painted brick cottages with a dentilled eaves course and a tile roof. There is one storey and attics, and three bays. The ground floor of both cottages has been extended outwards and No. 10 contains a canted bay window. There are three gabled dormers with shaped bargeboards and finials.	II
55 and 56 Waterloo Street; 52.62753°N 2.48248°W		18th century	A pair of back-to-back cottages in painted roughcast brick with dentilled eaves and a tile roof. There is one storey and attics. The windows are mullioned and transomed casements, there is a bay window, and gabled dormers.	II
Dale House; 52.64119°N 2.49386°W	—	18th century	The house, which has been much altered and used for other purposes, is in red brick. There are three storeys and five bays, and the windows are sashes.	II
Old Dale Cottage; 52.64095°N 2.49384°W	—	18th century	The building is in painted brick with a tile roof, two storeys and an attic, and four bays. The windows are casements with cambered heads. In the centre is a massive brick chimney stack. On the right is a two-storey, one-bay extension with sash windows, the ground floor window with a keystone.	II
The Swan Hotel; 52.62954°N 2.49154°W		18th century	The public house is in painted brick with tile roofs. The main block has three storeys, three bays, and a lean-to on the right. It contains casement windows, and a central doorway with an open pediment. To the left is a projecting wing with one storey and attic, two bays, and two gable ends facing the road. This contains a central doorway with a cornice on elaborate brackets, and sash windows.	II
Woodside House; 52.64005°N 2.49030°W	—	18th century	The house was refronted in brick in the 19th century. It has a coped parapet on the front, a tile roof, two storeys and an attic. There are three bays, the middle bay projecting with a pediment. On the front is a porch with a canopy, and a doorway with a moulded surround and panelled reveals. The windows are sashes with panelled lintels and stone sills.	II
Severn Cottages; 52.63149°N 2.49676°W		18th century	A brick house, painted and partly rendered, with a tile roof. There is one storey and an attic, and an L-shaped plan, with ranges of three and two bays, and there is a later rear extension. The windows are casements with segmental heads, and there are gabled dormers with Gothic glazing.	II
The Bedlam Furnace; 52.62704°N 2.47676°W		1757	The remains of three blast furnaces are in stone and brick. At the front is a wide brick arch flanked by stone buttresses, each containing a round-headed doorway and a circular opening above the doorway on the right. To the left is a larger arched opening. Behind are the combustion chambers. The structure is also a Scheduled Monument.	II*
The Chapel on the Rock; 52.62792°N 2.47535°W	—	Mid 18th century	A pair of brick cottages, possibly converted from a chapel. There is a gabled porch-like projection, and the windows are casements.	II
The Valley Hotel; 52.63096°N 2.49716°W		1757	A house, later a hotel, it is in red brick with modillion eaves and a hipped tile roof. There are three storeys, four bays, and a later projecting two-story wing on the left. The porch has a pediment on Tuscan columns. In the left bay is a full-height canted bay window, and the other windows are casements with keystones. The interior decoration includes Coalport china tiles.	II*
Belmont and Edgmont; 52.62926°N 2.48011°W		1758	A red brick house with a modillion eaves cornice and a tile roof. There are two storeys, five bays, and a single-bay wing to the right. The central doorway has pilasters, a rectangular fanlight, and a cornice on console brackets. The windows are sashes, there is a cartouche above the doorway, and over the window above is a circular window.	II
5 and 6 Darby Road; 52.63973°N 2.49381°W	—	Late 18th century	A pair of brick cottages with a dentilled eaves course and a tile roof. There are two storeys, three bays, and a rear outshut. The windows are casements. The doorways and ground floor windows have segmental-arched heads with keyblocks, and there is a gabled porch on the front.	II
20 and 21 Darby Road; 52.64043°N 2.49375°W	—	Late 18th century (probable)	A pair of red brick houses with a tile roof and coped gables. There are two storeys, four bays, and a recessed bay to the north. One doorway has pilasters, the other has a round head, and the windows are sashes.	II
15–17 Hodge Bower; 52.62968°N 2.48404°W	—	Late 18th century (probable)	A row of painted and rendered cottages with a tile roof, one storey and attics, a projecting bay on the right side, and rear extensions. The windows are casements with cambered heads, and there are four gabled dormers.	II
1 Market Square; 52.62807°N 2.48485°W		Late 18th century	The building, at one time a bank and later a shop, is stuccoed with a dentilled cornice above the ground floor, and a hipped tile roof. There are three storeys and two bays. The ground floor has bands of rustication, two doorways, the central doorway with a moulded architrave, and five windows with moulded surrounds. Above these is a continuous cornice and seven small square windows. The top two floors contain sash windows.	II
15 The Wharfage; 52.62875°N 2.48863°W		Late 18th century	A brown brick house with dentilled eaves and a tile roof. There are three storeys and two bays. The doorway has a porch with Tuscan columns, to the right is a bay window, and the windows are sashes with channelled lintels.	II
35–37 Wellington Road; 52.63734°N 2.48994°W	—	Late 18th century	A range of three russet brick cottages with modillion eaves and a tile roof. There are two storeys, and on the left is a protruding gabled bay. The windows are a mix of sashes and casements.	II
44–47 Wellington Road; 52.63665°N 2.48924°W	—	Late 18th century	A row of four russet brick cottages with modillion eaves and a tile roof. There is one storey and attics, most of the windows are casements, and there is one gabled dormer. The doorways have plain surrounds and gabled hoods.	II
52–54 Wellington Road; 52.63602°N 2.48873°W	—	Late 18th century	A row of three cottages in red brick, No. 54 roughcast, with modillion eaves, a tile roof, and one storey with attics. The window in No. 52 is a modern casement, and the other windows are sashes with cambered heads. There are four gabled dormers.	II
Springhill; 52.64051°N 2.49060°W	—	Late 18th century	A russet brick house with dentilled eaves, and a tile roof with coped gables. There are two storeys and an attic, and three bays. The doorway has a cornice hood on brackets, the windows have segmental heads and keyblocks, and there are two gabled dormers.	II
Former Talbot Inn and warehouse 52.62940°N 2.49049°W		Late 18th century	The former inn and warehouse are in painted brick with modillion eaves, tile roofs with coped gables, and contain sash windows with cambered heads. The inn has two storeys, two bays, a lower bay to the right, and a lower and narrower bay to the left with an arched entry. There are two doorways, each with pilasters, a rectangular fanlight, and a small hood. The warehouse attached to the left has three storeys and its gable end faces the road; this contains three bays, with two loading doors in the middle bay.	II
Madeley Wood Methodist School Chapel; 52.62874°N 2.47576°W		1777	A day school and former chapel, it is in brick with dentilled eaves and a tile roof. There is one storey and an attic, a rectangular plan, three bays, and an extension on the east end. The windows have moulded round arches and keyblocks. In the gable end is a lunette in the attic, below which is a plaque on consoles brackets, and a partly blocked Venetian window.	II
The Iron Bridge; 52.62729°N 2.48548°W		1777–80	The first substantial bridge in the world to be made from cast iron, it crosses the River Severn. The bridge consists of a single almost semicircular arch with a span of 100 feet (30 m) and is about 50 feet (15 m) above the normal level of the river. There are two concentric arches with connecting members, in the spandrels are a circle and an ogee arch, and there is a parapet of thin railings. In 1820 two extra arches were added to the south side because the river bank was unstable. Originally used by vehicles, it is now a footbridge. The bridge is also a Scheduled Monument.	I
Coalport Bridge; 52.61570°N 2.44184°W		1780	The bridge was rebuilt in 1799, and strengthened in 1818, and carries Coalport Road over the River Severn. The bridge is in cast iron and was cast at Coalbrookdale Ironworks. It consists of a single segmental arch on brick abutments, and has an openwork arch and an ornate balustraded parapet. The bridge is also a Scheduled Monument.	II*
The Tontine Hotel; 52.62789°N 2.48517°W		1783	The hotel is in red brick with an eaves band and a hipped tile roof. There are three storeys, five bays on the main front and three on the east front. On the main front is a central doorway with pilasters, an arched fanlight, an open pediment, and side lights, and the windows are sashes. The central bay of the east front projects forward and has a pediment with a large circular window in the tympanum, a Venetian window in a round-headed recess below, and a tripartite window in the ground floor. The outer bays contain a round-headed recess in the ground floor, a round-headed window in the middle floor, and a sash window in the top floor.	II*
Carpenters Row; 52.64004°N 2.49150°W		1780s	A row of ten red brick cottages with dentilled eaves and a tile roof. There are two storeys and each cottage has one bay. The doorways have plain surrounds, some have a canopy, and the windows are casements, those in the ground floor with cambered heads.	II
Ironbridge Wharf Walls; 52.62852°N 2.48865°W	—	1780s	The wall is in sandstone, with a stepped plinth, a ramp and two flights of steps. It runs on the north side of the River Seven from Severn Warehouse to the east of The Iron Bridge for a distance of about 900 metres (3,000 ft).	II
The Market Buildings; 52.62802°N 2.48458°W		c. 1790	The former market building, later used as shops, is in brown brick with a hipped slate roof. There are three storeys and attics and five bays, the middle and outer bays projecting slightly and containing round-headed recesses. In the ground floor is an arcade of five segmental arches, originally open, later filled with shop fronts, and with oval windows in the arches. At the top of the middle bay is a pediment with an oval window in the tympanum. The windows are sashes, some tripartite, and there are four gabled dormers.	II*
Snapper Furnace, Coalbrookdale Ironworks; 52.64070°N 2.49212°W	—	c. 1792	A blast furnace similar in design to The Old Furnace but never used. It is built in brick, and has a tunnel on two sides.	II*
Coalport Bridge Toll House; 52.61592°N 2.44156°W	—	1793	Originally a warehouse, later a toll house, it was extended in about 1860, and later became a private house. It is in brick with tile roofs, and has a single storey facing the road, and two storeys at the rear. The building consists of the former toll house facing the road, the former warehouse at the rear, and the extension to the rear of that.	II
Hay inclined plane 52.62077°N 2.45274°W		1793	The inclined plane was built to link the Shropshire Canal with a lower canal leading through the Coalport China Works to the River Severn. It rises for 207 feet (63 m), and was used for the last time in 1894. The inclined plane and rails have been restored. It is also a Scheduled Monument.	II
Coalport China works 52.61879°N 2.45112°W		1795	There are three surviving original kilns, most of the other buildings dating from the early 1900s. They are in brick with dentilled eaves and tile roofs, and have two, three or four storeys. They contain small-paned iron-framed casement windows with cambered heads.	II*
Green Bank Farmhouse; 52.64165°N 2.49258°W	—	c. 1800	A red brick house with a tile roof. There are three storeys, three bays, and recessed flanking two-storey wings. On the front are casement windows with cambered heads, and a central staircase window. In the right wing is a semicircular-headed doorway with a radial fanlight. The garden front contains sash windows with channelled lintels and keyblocks, and a doorway with pilasters, a radial fanlight, and a pediment.	II
35 and 36 Church Hill; 52.62969°N 2.48728°W		Late 18th or early 19th century	A pair of painted rendered cottages with a tile roof. There are two storeys and three bays. No. 35 has a porch, and the windows are casements, those in the ground floor with cambered heads.	II
32 and 32A High Street; 52.62769°N 2.48430°W		Late 18th or early 19th century	A red brick shop, colour-washed at the front, with modillion eaves, and a tile roof. There are two storeys and an attic, a basement at the rear, and three bays. In the ground floor a shop front projects, and in the upper floor are sash windows with channeled lintels and keyblocks.	II
33 High Street; 52.62767°N 2.48443°W		Late 18th or early 19th century	The building is in brick with a painted front, modillion eaves, and a tile roof. There are two storeys and two bays. In the ground floor is a projecting shop front, and the upper floor contains sash windows.	II
14–16 Ladywood; 52.62608°N 2.48154°W	—	18th or 19th century	A group of three painted brick cottages with a rear wall in stone, a dentilled eaves course, a tile roof, and two storeys. No. 16 is at right angles to the road, Nos. 14 and 15 form a wing at right angles. The windows are casements, and No. 16 has a string course.	II
9 Tontine Hill; 52.62785°N 2.48577°W		Late 18th or early 19th century	A shop in engraved stucco with a tile roof, three storeys and one bay. In the ground floor is an early 19th-century shop front with pilasters and a doorway with a rectangular fanlight, all under a cornice, and in the upper floors are sash windows.	II
10 Tontine Hill; 52.62785°N 2.48567°W		Late 18th or early 19th century	A shop in engraved stucco with a tile roof, three storeys and three bays. In the ground floor is a 19th-century shop front and a passageway to the left. The central window in the middle floor is an oriel window, and the other windows are sashes.	II
11 and 12 Waterloo Street; 52.62705°N 2.47801°W		Late 18th or early 19th century	A house in painted brick with a dentilled eaves course and a hipped tile roof. There are two storeys and a basement, the main block has two bays, there is a rear wing, and to the right is a later two-storey projecting lean-to wing containing a doorway with a hood. The windows are casements with segmental heads.	II
Brook House; 52.64185°N 2.49428°W	—	Late 18th or early 19th century	A red brick house at right angles to the road, with a dentilled eaves course and a hipped tile roof. There are three storeys, three bays, and gabled rear wings. The doorway has pilasters, a reeded frieze and a hood. The windows are sashes with rusticated lintels and keystones.	II
Retaining wall east of Dale House; 52.64127°N 2.49363°W	—	18th or early 19th century	The retaining wall is in sandstone with brick in the upper part and stone coping.	II
Coach house, Rosehill House; 52.64156°N 2.49415°W	—	18th or 19th century	The coach house is in brick with a hipped roof, two storeys and five bays. The central bay is wider, it projects forward and has a pediment containing a circular window in the tympanum. In the ground floor of the middle bay is a wide elliptical opening, and the windows are sashes.	II
The Chestnuts; 52.64193°N 2.49513°W	—	18th or 19th century	A brick house with a moulded eaves cornice. There are two storeys, four bays, and a recessed one-bay wing on the right. The windows are sashes with voussoirs and keystones, and there are two dormers with cambered heads.	II
The Golden Ball Public House; 52.62843°N 2.47537°W		18th or 19th century	The public house is in painted brick with a dentilled eaves course and a tile roof. There are two storeys and an L-shaped plan, and the windows are casements.	II
Upper Forge; 52.63472°N 2.49001°W	—	18th or 19th century	Originally stabling for the ironworks, it is in whitewashed brick with a tile roof. There is a single storey, a lean-to extension to the right, and a two-storey extension to the left. The windows have fixed lights, some are blocked, and there is a doorway with a cambered head and another with a round head.	II
Former Police Station and Court Room; 52.62761°N 2.48269°W		c. 1820	The building is in blue brick with dressings in yellow brick and stone, brick corbel brackets in the eaves, and a hipped slate roof. There are two storeys, four bays, and a rear wing containing the court room. In the ground floor is an open arcade of segmental stone arches with keyblocks, cast iron railings and a gate. The upper floor contains sash windows with moulded architraves in segmental arches with keyblocks.	II
24 Belmont Road; 52.62861°N 2.47787°W	—	Early 19th century	A buff brick house with a tile roof, two storeys and three bays. The doorway has pilasters, and the windows are sashes, those in the ground floor with segmental heads.	II
17–19 Buildwas Road; 52.63115°N 2.49652°W		Early 19th century	A row of brick cottages, one painted, at right angles to the road, with a brick eaves course and a tile roof. There are two storeys and five bays. The windows are sashes with segmental arches, and there is a canted bay window.	II
78 Bower Yard; 52.62811°N 2.48999°W		Early 19th century	A cottage in painted brick with a tile roof, one storey and an attic. On the right side is a rectangular oriel window, the other windows are casements with segmental heads, and there are three gabled dormers.	II
1 and 2 Cherry Tree Hill; 52.64190°N 2.48937°W		Early 19th century	A pair of cottages in russet brick with a tile roof. There are two storeys, four bays, and a single-storey outbuilding at each end. The windows are casements; the windows in the ground floor and the doorways have cambered heads.	II
7 and 8 Church Hill; 52.62807°N 2.48357°W		Early 19th century	A buff brick house with dentilled eaves and a tile roof. There are two storeys and an attic, and four bays. The doorway has a hood, the windows are sashes, and there is one gabled dormer.	II
12 Church Hill; 52.62831°N 2.48429°W		Early 19th century	A red brick house with a tile roof, two storeys, and two bays. Above the doorway is a small hood, and the windows are casements with channelled lintels and keyblocks.	II
16 Church Hill; 52.62840°N 2.48445°W		Early 19th century	A house in russet brick with dentilled eaves and a tile roof. There are two storeys and two bays. The doorway has a cambered head, and the windows are sashes, those in the ground floor with keyblocks and channelled lintels. Attached to the left is a five-storey outbuilding.	II
26 Church Road, gates and piers 52.63759°N 2.48885°W	—	Early 19th century	A russet brick house with two storeys and three bays. The central doorway has a moulded surround with fluted pilasters, panelled reveals, a radial fanlight, and an open pediment. The windows are sashes with channelled lintels and keyblocks. At the entrance to the garden are cast iron gates that have square rendered piers with cast iron cornices caps and ball finials.	II
27 Church Road; 52.63621°N 2.48724°W	—	Early 19th century	A brown brick house with a tile roof. There are two storeys and a T-shaped plan, consisting of a three-bay range and a rear wing. The doorway has pilasters, a rectangular fanlight and a cornice hood. The windows in the main range are sashes, and in the wing they are casements.	II
60 and 61 Coalport High Street; 52.62063°N 2.45316°W		Early 19th century	A pair of rendered brick cottages, possibly with an earlier core, and with a tile roof. There are two storeys and three bays. The doorways have plain surrounds, and the windows are casements.	II
7–10 Darby Road; 52.64011°N 2.49360°W	—	Early 19th century	A row of four brick houses with dentilled eaves courses and tile roofs. No. 8 has one storey and an attic, and the other houses have two storeys. No. 8 has a string course, a doorway with pilasters and a cornice, sash windows with panelled lintels, and two attic gables. The other houses have casement windows and doorways with moulded surrounds, and there are round-headed passageways.	II
11 and 12 Darby Road; 52.64027°N 2.49363°W	—	Early 19th century	A red brick house with modillion eaves and a hipped tile roof. There are three storeys and three bays. The central doorway has a plain surround, and the windows are sashes with channelled lintels and keyblocks. On the north side are modern windows and a porch.	II
28 High Street; 52.62774°N 2.48375°W		Early 19th century	A house, later used for other purposes, it is in painted brick with three storeys and two bays. The central doorway has pilasters and a cornice hood. In the ground floor are small-paned windows, and the upper floors contain sash windows with channelled lintels and keyblocks.	II
29 and 30 High Street; 52.62775°N 2.48395°W		Early 19th century	An office and a shop in painted brick with quoins, coved eaves, a slate roof, three storeys and four bays. In the ground floor is engraved stucco, a doorway with a plain surround to the left, a tripartite sash window, and a modern shop front to the right. In the upper floors are sash windows with cornices on consoles.	II
34 High Street; 52.62768°N 2.48458°W	—	Early 19th century	A brick shop with a hipped pantile roof, three storeys and three bays. In the left two bays in the ground floor is a shop front with two small-paned windows flanking double doors, four pilasters, and an overall fascia and cornice. The windows are sashes.	II
3 and 4 Ladywood; 52.62675°N 2.48393°W		Early 19th century	A pair of painted brick cottages with a tile roof and two storeys. The windows are casements, and there is a projecting outbuilding at the front.	II
5 and 6 Ladywood; 52.62675°N 2.48414°W		Early 19th century	A pair of red brick cottages with a tile roof, two storeys, and three bays. The doorways have plain surrounds and rectangular fanlights, and the windows are casements with cambered heads.	II
15 Madeley Road; 52.62834°N 2.47661°W		Early 19th century	A house in engraved rendering, at one time the George and Dragon Inn, with dentilled eaves and a tile roof. There are two storeys, two bays, and a single-storey wing on the right. The central doorway has pilasters and a small hood, and the windows are sashes with channelled lintels and keyblocks.	II
1 New Road; 52.62920°N 2.48962°W		Early 19th century	A brick cottage with a tile roof, two storeys and two bays. The central doorway has pilasters and a cornice hood, and the windows are sashes with channelled lintels and keyblocks.	II
2–6 New Road; 52.62907°N 2.48858°W		Early 19th century	A terrace of five brick cottages with a tile roof. There are two storeys, and each cottage has one bay. The doorways have pilasters, and the windows are sashes with channelled lintels.	II
11 and 12 Paradise; 52.63466°N 2.48914°W	—	Early 19th century	A pair of russet brick cottages with a tile roof, two storeys and four bays. The doorways have moulded surrounds with pilasters and cornice hoods, and the windows are sashes.	II
10 Severn Bank; 52.62798°N 2.48640°W		Early 19th century	The house probably has an 18th-century core. It is in brick with some stone at the rear, and has a tile roof. There are three storeys and two bays. The doorway has pilasters and a cornice hood on brackets, and the windows are sashes with segmental heads.	II
14 Severnside; 52.62733°N 2.48361°W	—	Early 19th century	A brick cottage with a tile roof and gabled ends. There are two storeys and two bays. The central doorway has pilasters and moulded hoods on shaped brackets, and the windows are sashes with plain stone lintels.	II
1 and 2 St Luke's Road; 52.62810°N 2.48018°W	—	Early 19th century	A pair of red brick cottages with a tile roof. There are two storeys, a small gable on the left, and a protruding single-storey extension on the right. The windows are casements, those in the lower floor and the upper floor of the gabled bay with cambered heads.	II
2 The Wharfage; 52.62780°N 2.48647°W		Early 19th century	A shop in painted brick with a tile roof, three storeys and one bay. In the ground floor is a shallow canted shop window, and a doorway to the right with a rectangular fanlight, above which is a fluted frieze and cornice. The upper floors contain sash windows with channelled lintels and keystones.	II
17 The Wharfage; 52.62909°N 2.48982°W		Early 19th century	A brick cottage with two storeys and two bays, and a lower roughcast extension with two storeys and an attic, its gable end facing the road. The main part has casement windows and a doorway with a plain surround and a bracketed cornice hood. The extension contains garage doors, a mix of windows, and two gabled dormers.	II
31 and 32 The Wharfage; 52.62993°N 2.49249°W		Early 19th century	A pair of painted brick cottages with a tile roof, one storey and attics. The windows are mullioned and transomed; they and the doorways have cambered heads, and there are gabled dormers.	II
33 The Wharfage; 52.62994°N 2.49265°W		Early 19th century	A buff brick house with a tile roof, hipped on the left. There are three storeys and four bays. The doorway has pilasters, a rectangular fanlight, and a small cornice hood, and the windows are sashes with plain lintels and keyblocks.	II
7 Tontine Hill; 52.62783°N 2.48596°W		Early 19th century	A brown brick shop with a tile roof, three storeys and two bays. In the ground floor are late 19th-century shop fronts, and the upper floors contain sash windows, one with a channelled lintel and keyblock.	II
8 Tontine Hill; 52.62784°N 2.48586°W		Early 19th century	A painted brick shop with dentilled eaves and a tile roof. There are two storeys and two bays. In the ground floor is a 19th-century shop front and an arched doorway to the right, and the upper floor contains sash windows with channelled lintels.	II
12 and 13 Tontine Hill; 52.62790°N 2.48543°W		Early 19th century	A pair of brick shops with a hipped tile roof. There are three storeys, and two bays. In the ground floor are two shop fronts and a semicircular archway between them. The windows are sashes with voussoirs and keystones.	II
31 Wellington Road; 52.63778°N 2.49036°W	—	Early 19th century	A brick house, probably with an earlier core, it has modillion eaves and a tile roof with coped gables. There are two storeys and two bays. The doorway has pilasters and an open pediment, and the windows are sashes with cast iron lintels.	II
34 Wellington Road; 52.63769°N 2.49018°W	—	Early 19th century	A red brick cottage with a tile roof, two storeys and two bays. The central doorway has pilasters, and the windows are casements with arched lights.	II
7 Woodside; 52.64038°N 2.49086°W	—	Early 19th century	The house probably has an 18th-century core. It is in red brick with modillion eaves and a tile roof. There are three storeys and two bays. The doorway has a plain surround and a cornice hood on brackets, and the windows are casements with cambered heads.	II
Bridge House; 52.62626°N 2.48561°W		Early 19th century	A brown brick house with a tile roof, three storeys, a basement at the rear, and three bays. The doorway has a rectangular fanlight and a cornice hood, and the windows are casements with cambered heads. At the rear is a canted bay window.	II
Former Butter Market; 52.62786°N 2.48429°W		Early 19th century	The butter market, later used for other purposes, is in painted brick with a modillion eaves cornice and a hipped tile roof. There are two storeys, and sides of one and four bays. The ground floor is arcaded and was originally open, later filled with shop fronts. In the upper floor are three sash windows with voussoired lintels.	II
Crown Inn and outbuildings 52.62967°N 2.48490°W		Early 19th century	The public house is in red brick with a tile roof, three storeys and three bays. The central doorway has pilasters, a radial fanlight, and a pedimented hood, and above it is a blocked window in each floor. The outer bays contain sash windows with cambered heads. On the left is a projecting outbuilding with two storeys and a gable end facing the road, and to the right is a two-storey wing with a casement window and a doorway.	II
Engine Row; 52.64107°N 2.48967°W	—	Early 19th century	A row of cottages in russet brick with modillion eaves and a tile roof. There are two storeys, and the doorways have cambered heads. There are some small-paned cast iron windows, but most are modern casements. To the right of the row is a gabled extension.	II
Lincoln House; 52.62965°N 2.48565°W	—	Early 19th century	A red brick house with tile roofs, and two wings. The earlier wing has two storeys, casement windows, and a doorway with a gabled hood. The north wing dates from the mid 19th century, and has two storeys and a basement, a doorway with a moulded surround, a sash window, a canted bay window, and a gabled dormer. On the west side is a terrace with segmental archways below.	II
Mill Cottages; 52.62601°N 2.48555°W	—	Early 19th century	A pair of russet brick houses, partly painted, with modillion eaves and a tile roof. There are three storeys, four bays, and a single-storey outbuilding on the left. The windows are casements and one doorway has a bracketed hood.	II
Old Rectory; 52.63026°N 2.48735°W	—	Early 19th century	A buff brick house with two storeys. On the south front is a slightly projecting bay, the windows are mullioned and transomed, and there is a canted bay window on the right. On the west side are extensions, and a projecting wing to the north.	II
Old School House; 52.64125°N 2.48982°W	—	Early 19th century	A school, later divided into apartments, it is in russet brick with a tile roof. There are two storeys and three bays. The windows are small-pane casements, those in the upper floor with semicircular cast iron heads, and in the ground floor with flat cast iron lintels. There are two doorways and a porch.	II
Oswald House; 52.63476°N 2.48680°W	—	Early 19th century (probable)	A red brick house with modillion eaves and a hipped tile roof. There are three storeys, a range of two bays, a later single-story wing on the right, and a modern rear extension on steel columns. The windows are small-paned casements, and in the wing is a large angled bay window.	II
Premises occupied by The Nunway Manufacturing Company Limited; 52.61835°N 2.44929°W		Early 19th century	The building is in painted brick with a hipped tile roof, and two storeys. The windows are multi-paned, some are fixed, others are casements, and they have segmental heads. The doorways have fluted pilasters, traceried fanlights, and broken pediments.	II
Quaker Burial Ground; 52.64165°N 2.49521°W		Early 19th century (probable)	The burial ground is a rectangular grassed area surrounded by brick walls. The headstones are arranged against the longer walls and carry weathered inscriptions.	II
Severn Lodge; 52.62868°N 2.48757°W		Early 19th century	A brick house with a hipped tile roof, two storeys and three bays. The doorway has a moulded surround, fluted pilasters, panelled reveals, a radial fanlight, and an open pediment. The windows are sashes.	II
Toll house, The Iron Bridge; 52.62695°N 2.48567°W		Early 19th century	The former toll house at the south end of the bridge is in red brick with a tile roof. It has three storeys, with the top storey at the level of the road. The windows have segmental heads.	II
Wheel pit, Coalbrookdale Ironworks; 52.64058°N 2.49310°W	—	Early 19th century	The structure consists of two high parallel brick walls between which are the remains of a wheel pit that accommodated an iron water wheel.	II
White Hart Inn; 52.62823°N 2.48758°W		Early 19th century	The public house is in painted brick with dentilled eaves and a tile roof. There are two storeys and an L-shaped plan. It contains sash and casement windows, a doorway with a fanlight, and three doorways with segmental heads.	II
South View and railings 52.62851°N 2.48467°W		1830	A brown brick house with a tile roof, three storeys, and four bays. The second bay projects forward and has a gable with an open pediment. In the ground floor is a round-headed doorway with a moulded surround, pilasters, and a traceried fanlight. The windows are sashes; the window in the top floor of the second bay is round-headed, the others are flat-headed, and all have lintels and keyblocks. In front of the forecourt are wrought iron railings and a pair of gates.	II
Parish Rooms; 52.62792°N 2.48182°W		1831	Originally an infant school, later used for other purposes, the building is in buff brick on a high plinth, with a dentilled eaves cornice and a tile roof. There is one tall storey and three bays, the middle bay slightly projecting and gabled. The windows are mullioned and have hood moulds, and in the gable apex is a datestone.	II
Severn Wharf Building; 52.62953°N 2.49221°W		1834	Originally a warehouse and wharf, later a museum, it is in red brick with yellow brick dressings, and is in Gothick style. There is a single storey, and the entrance front has two four-centred arched doorways between which is a protruding embattled polygonal apse flanked by embattled turrets. Along the sides are four gables, and the windows have pointed heads.	II*
10 Church Hill; 52.62819°N 2.48393°W	—	Early to mid 19th century	A house in russet brick with dentilled eaves and a tile roof. There are two storeys and two bays. The windows are sashes with keyblocks and channelled lintels.	II
13 Church Hill; 52.62845°N 2.48393°W		Early to mid 19th century	A red brick house with a tile roof, two storeys and three bays. The windows are sashes, those in the ground floor with voussoired lintels and keyblocks.	II
17 Coalport High Street; 52.62019°N 2.45302°W		Early to mid 19th century	A red brick house with a dentilled eaves course and a tile roof. There are two storeys facing the road and three at the rear, and a two-storey wing to the west. The windows are a mix of sashes and casements, and in the ground floor is a segmental-headed doorway to the Tar Tunnel.	II
54–56 Coalport High Street; 52.61688°N 2.44368°W	—	Early to mid 19th century	A group of three red brick cottages with hipped and gabled slate roofs. There are two storeys and four bays. The round-headed doorways have fanlights, and the windows are casements, those in the ground floor with segmental arches.	II
42 and 43 Darby Road; 52.64186°N 2.49481°W	—	Early to mid 19th century	A brick house with a tile roof, two storeys and six bays. The windows are sashes with cast iron lintels. On the front is a cast iron portico with two Doric columns, pilasters, a fanlight, and an entablature with a moulded cornice.	II
24 High Street; 52.62773°N 2.48330°W		Early to mid 19th century	A house on corner site, later used for other purposes, and at one time a bank, it is in painted brick with a hipped tile roof. There are three storeys and two bays. In the ground floor are shop fronts, and the upper floors contain sash windows with panelled lintels.	II
25–27 High Street; 52.62775°N 2.48354°W		Early to mid 19th century	A row of three painted brick shops with a hipped tile roof. There are three storeys and five bays. In the ground floor are shop fronts, and the upper floors contain sash windows with panelled lintels.	II
31 High Street; 52.62773°N 2.48417°W		Early to mid 19th century	A house, later two shops, the building is in painted brick with a tile roof. There are three storeys and four bays. In the ground floor are two shop windows, a doorway with pilasters and a hood, and a round-headed entrance. The middle floor contains two tripartite sash windows flanking a blind window, and in the top floor are four sash windows. Most of the windows have lintels with keyblocks.	II
11–14 Hodge Bower; 52.62965°N 2.48471°W		Early to mid 19th century	A row of cottages in buff brick, one of which has painted stucco. The roof is tiled, there are two storeys, and each cottage has one bay, a doorway with a plain surround, and casement windows.	II
24 St Luke's Road; 52.62865°N 2.48385°W	—	Early to mid 19th century	A buff brick house with a dentilled eaves cornice and a hipped tile roof. There are two storeys and three bays. The windows are sashes with voussoired lintels and keyblocks.	II
3 and 4 The Wharfage; 52.62784°N 2.48667°W		Early to mid 19th century	A pair of painted brick shops with tile roofs, three storeys, three bays each, and sash windows. In the ground floor are 19th-century shop fronts with pilasters, and between the shops is an arched entrance with a keyblock. The middle bay of the right shop projects and has a pedimented gable containing an oculus. Above the windows in the upper floor are channelled lintels and keyblocks, and the lintels in the left shop are plain.	II
20A The Wharfage; 52.62943°N 2.49110°W		Early to mid 19th century	A former warehouse converted for residential use, it is in brown brick with the gable end facing the road. There are three storeys, a central doorway with a loading door in each storey, and windows, all with cambered heads.	II
6A Tontine Hill; 52.62783°N 2.48608°W		Early to mid 19th century	A shop in painted brick with a tile roof, three storeys and two bays. In the ground floor is a late 19th-century shop front with pilasters and a cornice, and to the right is an entry. The upper floors contain modern casement windows.	II
14 Wellington Road; 52.63894°N 2.49152°W	—	Early to mid 19th century	A brick house with modillion eaves and a tile roof. There are two storeys and a basement, two bays, and a single-storey extension on the right. The doorway has pilasters and a cornice hood, and the windows are sashes.	II
32 and 33 Wellington Road; 52.63756°N 2.49043°W	—	Early to mid 19th century	A pair of painted brick houses with a hipped slate roof, two storeys, and one bay each. In the ground floor are 19th-century shop fronts with pilasters, entablatures, and multi-paned windows, and in the upper floor are casement windows with voussoirs and keyblocks.	II
Coalport House; 52.61691°N 2.44224°W	—	Early to mid 19th century	A row of red brick houses with a tile roof, two storeys and four bays. Some windows are sashes, others are casements, and all have plain stone lintels and keyblocks.	II
Churchyard railings 52.62834°N 2.48502°W	—	Early to mid 19th century	The railings are in the churchyard of St Luke's Church. They are in cast iron, and consist of a single length running from the southeast corner of the church.	II
Former coach house, Dale House; 52.64080°N 2.49343°W	—	Early to mid 19th century	The building is in red brick with a hipped tile roof. There are two storeys and five bays, the middle bay projecting under a gable. The windows are casements, and the middle window in the upper floor has a central round head. Garage doors and a canopy have been inserted in the ground floor.	II
Mill House Cottages; 52.64154°N 2.48984°W	—	Early to mid 19th century	A pair of brick cottages with a tile roof. There are two storeys and three bays. The windows are small-paned casements with cast iron lintels.	II
Paradise House; 52.63494°N 2.48904°W		Early to mid 19th century	A brick house with a tile roof, two storeys, three bays, and a parallel rear wing. The central doorway has a moulded surround with pilasters, panelled reveals, a radial fanlight, and an open pediment. The windows are sash window with segmental lintels and keyblocks.	II
The Brewery Inn and 46–50 Coalport High Street; 52.61714°N 2.44511°W		Early to mid 19th century	The public house and attached range of cottages are in buff brick, and have a tiled roof at differing levels. There are two storeys and a total of 14 bays. In the centre is a cart entry with a segmental arch, and the doors and windows, most of which are casements, also have segmental heads.	II
The Brockholes; 52.62911°N 2.47946°W	—	Early to mid 19th century	A row of cottages in three blocks stepped down a slope, in russet brick, with two storeys and 14 bays. The doorways and windows, some of which are sashes and others are small-paned casements, all have cambered heads.	II
The Rookery; 52.63895°N 2.49153°W	—	Early to mid 19th century	A brick house with modillion eaves and a tile roof. There are two storeys and two bays. The doorway has pilasters and a cornice hood, and the windows are sashes with plain lintels and stone sills.	II
St Luke's Church; 52.62846°N 2.48521°W		1835–36	The church is in brick with stone dressings and a Welsh slate roof, and is in Gothick style. It consists of a nave, a short chancel with a gabled apse, and a west tower. The tower has three stages, octagonal stair turrets, clock faces, and an embattled parapet with angle pinnacles. Along the nave are paired lancet windows and gabled buttresses. Inside the church are galleries on three sides.	II
Madeley Wood Methodist Chapel; 52.62906°N 2.47625°W		1837	The former chapel is in buff brick with two storeys, and three bays in each front. The bays in the entrance front are divided by pilasters, the outer bays have raking parapets, and the central bay has a higher parapet with a cornice and entablature. The central doorway has pilasters and a cornice, the windows in the lower storey have flat heads, and those in the upper storey have round heads.	II
Warehouse with clock tower, Coalbrookdale Ironworks; 52.63924°N 2.49295°W		1838	An ornate clock was added to the warehouse in 1843, and the building has later been used as part of a museum. It is in red brick with a double-span roof, three storeys and fronts of eight and four bays. The windows are casements with cast iron glazing bars, lintels and sills. In the centre of the roof is a square cast iron with a cupola and fluted ball finial, fluted angle shafts, and a round clock face on each side. This is all supported by an ornamental openwork cast iron cradle with splayed legs.	II*
Office range, Coalbrookdale Ironworks; 52.63899°N 2.49291°W	—	1838–47	The office range has been altered and extended. Originally in stone, much has been rebuilt in brick with hipped roofs of clay tiles. The main range has two storeys with an L-shaped plan, a single-storey three-bay range to the east, and a southwest wing at right angles. They contain multi-pane cast iron windows.	II
The Grove Inn; 52.63927°N 2.49186°W		1839	The public house is in brick with modillion eaves and a tile roof, and consists of two parallel ranges. There are two storeys, and in the front facing north is a two-storey bay window. The doorway has a moulded surround, a rectangular fanlight, and a cornice, and the windows are sashes. Cast iron railings enclose a small forecourt.	II
The Cottage; 52.62450°N 2.46200°W	—	c. 1840	A school converted into a house, it is in painted brick and has a tile roof with kneelers and coped gables. The back of the house faces the road, the main block has two storeys and an attic, and to the east is a wing with one storey and an attic. On the garden front is a gabled porch, the entrance with a pointed arch. Some of the windows have pointed arches and lattice glazing, at least one has a hood mould, and the other windows are casements.	II
The Manse; 52.62923°N 2.47649°W		c. 1840	The former manse to the Wesley Chapel is in buff brick with a hipped slate roof. There are two storeys and three bays. The central doorway has pilasters, a rectangular fanlight and a hood on console brackets. The windows are casements with voussoired lintels.	II
2–4 Southside; 52.62889°N 2.48597°W	—	c. 1841	Originally offices, later converted for residential use, the building is in buff brick with modillion eaves and a tile roof. It is built on a slope, and has two storeys at the front and four at the rear. On the front is a projecting gabled bay on the right, and a mix of casement and sash windows, the later with hood moulds. At the rear is a three-storey semicircular bay window with an open balustrade, and a two-storey gabled bay to the right, and the windows are mullioned and transomed.	II
The Coalbrookdale Inn; 52.63901°N 2.49159°W		1843	The public house is in brick with a hipped tile roof, two storeys and a basement, and four bays. The doorway has pilasters and a rectangular fanlight, and the windows are sashes with channelled lintels and keyblocks. In front of the building is a walled perron with steps on both sides.	II
20 and 21 Buildwas Road; 52.63106°N 2.49673°W		Mid 19th century	A pair of brick cottages at right angles to the road, with two storeys The roof is in Benthall tiles coloured red, yellow and green, and arranged in diamond and lozenge patterns. The windows are casements, in the upper floor they have cast iron round heads, in the ground floor they have wooden cambered heads, and the doorways have plain surrounds.	II
29 Church Hill; 52.62998°N 2.48744°W		Mid 19th century	The house is in blue brick with yellow brick dressings and a tile roof. There are two storeys and two bays. The central doorway has a semicircular head and a fanlight, to its left is a canted bay window, and the other windows are sashes with cambered heads.	II
41 Church Hill and railings 52.62983°N 2.48805°W	—	Mid 19th century	A yellow brick house with bracketed eaves and a hipped slate roof. There are two storeys and three bay bays. The windows are sashes with segmental-arched lintels. On the ground floor is a latticed verandah, gabled in the centre and over the bays. Also at the front is a terrace with cast iron railings.	II
1 and 2 Darby Road; 52.63927°N 2.49391°W	—	Mid 19th century	A pair of red brick cottages with a moulded eaves course and a tile roof. There are two storeys, a double-pile plan, and two bays. The doorways have plain surrounds, and the windows are casements with hood moulds.	II
3 and 4 Darby Road; 52.63944°N 2.49392°W	—	Mid 19th century	A pair of red brick cottages with a tile roof, two storeys and four bays. The doorways have plain surrounds, and the windows are casements with hood moulds.	II
22 and 23 Darby Road; 52.64067°N 2.49352°W	—	19th century	A row of red brick cottages with modillion eaves and a tile roof. There are two storeys and four bays. The doorways have plain surrounds, and the windows are casements.	II
28 Darby Road; 52.64162°N 2.49422°W	—	Mid 19th century	A painted brick cottage with a tile roof, two storeys and two bays. The central doorway has a moulded surround and an openwork cast iron porch. The windows are sashes with segmental heads.	II
7–9 Ladywood; 52.62686°N 2.48454°W		Mid 19th century	A terrace of three houses in brown brick, with two storeys. Each house has one bay, a doorway with a plain surround and a gabled porch. The windows are casements with cambered heads.	II
18 The Wharfage; 52.62906°N 2.49000°W		Mid 19th century	A red brick house with yellow brick dressings, quoins, and a tile roof. There are two storeys and two bays. The central doorway has pilasters, and the windows are casements with hood moulds in blue brick.	II
20 The Wharfage; 52.62940°N 2.49125°W		19th century	A buff brick house with bands of red and blue brick and a tile roof. There are two storeys and three bays. The central doorway has pilasters, a rectangular fanlight, and a small hood, and the windows are sashes.	II
35 The Wharfage; 52.63015°N 2.49362°W		Mid 19th century	A brick shop with tile roofs. The left bay has a gable end facing the road, and three storeys. In the ground floor is a shop window with pilasters, and in the upper floors are casement windows with stone hood moulds on console brackets. To the right is a single-storey wing containing a shop window and a doorway with a bracketed hood.	II
39 Wellington Road; 52.63703°N 2.48998°W	—	Mid 19th century	A buff brick cottage with a tile roof, two storeys, and two bays. The central doorway has pilasters, an entablature, and a rectangular fanlight. The windows are sashes with voussoired lintels and fluted keystones.	II
43 Wellington Road; 52.63689°N 2.48946°W	—	Mid 19th century	A buff brick house with dentilled eaves and a tile roof. There are two storeys and two bays. The central doorway has pilasters, a rectangular fanlight, and an entablature. The windows are sashes with moulded segmental-arched lintels and keyblocks.	II
Dale End House; 52.63093°N 2.49624°W		Mid 19th century	A buff brick house, at one time a police station, with corner pilasters, overhanging eaves, and a hipped slate roof. There are two storeys and three bays. The central doorway has pilasters and an entablature, and the windows are sashes with panelled lintels and hood moulds on small brackets.	II
Bridge over the Hay inclined plane 52.62031°N 2.45327°W		Mid 19th century	The bridge carries a road over the lower part of the inclined plane. It is in brick, and consists of a single segmental arch. The bridge has a parapet with sandstone coping.	II
Hawthorns; 52.62898°N 2.48094°W	—	Mid 19th century	A buff brick house with bracketed eaves and a hipped slate roof. There are two storeys and two bays. The doorway has a chamfered stone surround and a small cornice, and the windows are sashes with cast iron segmental lintels.	II
Ladywood Cottage; 52.62618°N 2.48484°W		Mid 19th century	Originally the stationmaster's house, it is in russet brick with modillion eaves and a tile roof. There are two storeys and two bays, each bay with a small gable. The doorway has a plain surround and a triangular head, and the windows are casements with triangular heads and moulded hood moulds. The chimney stacks are tall and have yellow brick dressings.	II
Orchard House; 52.62940°N 2.48708°W	—	Mid 19th century	A red brick house with dressings in stone and yellow brick, and an ornamental tile roof with coped gables. The centre of the front projects slightly, it is gabled, and contains a casement window with a hood mould, and a doorway with a fanlight and side lights. On the front facing the road are two gables, one with an obelisk finial.	II
Prospect House; 52.62784°N 2.47957°W		Mid 19th century	A buff brick house with a hipped slate roof. The back of the house faces the road, where there are two storeys, and there are four storeys at the front. In the upper floor are two sash windows with segmental-arched lintels and keyblocks, and the ground floor contains French windows with moulded architraves, and an ornate cast iron verandah with brick piers.	II
Rectory; 52.62988°N 2.48656°W	—	Mid 19th century	A buff brick house with a tile roof, two storeys and a projecting gabled wing. The windows are sashes with semicircular heads, and there is a doorway with a moulded surround and a cornice hood in a bay on the east side.	II
Registrar's Office; 52.62795°N 2.48630°W	—	Mid 19th century	The building, probably with an 18th-century core, is refronted in brick, and has a slate roof. There are three storeys, two bays, and a projecting gabled right wing containing a rectangular stone bay window. The other windows are sashes with hood moulds, and the doorway has pilasters, panelled reveals and a pedimented hood.	II
Former Roman Catholic School; 52.63386°N 2.49541°W		Mid 19th century	The building is in brick with a pyramidal tile roof. It has a square plan, and contains a window and a doorway.	II
Railings and piers, Rosehill House; 52.64147°N 2.49384°W	—	Mid 19th century	The retaining wall in front of the forecourt is in brick and the railings are in cast iron. There are two rusticated stone piers, each with a cornice cap and a large iron finial.	II
Station Hotel; 52.62626°N 2.48472°W		Mid 19th century	The hotel is in blue brick with yellow brick dressings and a tile roof. There are three storeys, four bays, and a two-storey, one-bay wing on the left. The doorways have segmental heads, and the windows are casements, those in the middle floor with moulded lintels.	II
The Elms; 52.63141°N 2.49586°W		Mid 19th century	A buff brick house that has a tile roof with gables, ornate openwork bargeboards, finials and pendants. There are two storeys and three bays, the left bay projecting and gabled. On the front is a large porch, and the windows are casements, some with pedimented lintels and hood moulds. The chimney stacks have circular shafts with spiral moulding and octagonal caps.	II
The Grove; 52.62889°N 2.48711°W	—	Mid 19th century	A buff brick house with moulded eaves and a hipped tile roof. There are two storeys and three bays, the middle bay projecting under a pediment containing a circular window. The central doorway has Tuscan columns, a moulded surround, and a pedimented hood. In the ground floor are canted bay windows, and the upper floor contains sash windows with shutters.	II
The Laurels; 52.62886°N 2.48027°W	—	Mid 19th century	A buff brick house with bracketed eaves and a hipped slate roof. There are two storeys, two bays, a later bay on the right, and further extensions to the north. On the west side is a porch, and the windows are sashes with cornices on consoles.	II
The Old Wind; 52.64263°N 2.48865°W	—	Mid 19th century	An incline used for moving goods by winding engine between the railway and the canal. It is now overgrown.	II
The Shrubbery; 52.62805°N 2.48056°W	—	Mid 19th century	A house in blue brick with dressings in stone and yellow brick on a sandstone plinth with moulded bracketed eaves, and a tile roof with coped gables and kneelers. There are two storeys. On the right is a gable with a raking hood mould, and the windows are casements with hood moulds. The ground floor contains a rectangular bay window with an embattled parapet, and a canted oriel window.	II
Wall of slag blocks 52.62642°N 2.47100°W	—	19th century	The wall on the south side of the road is formed from blocks of furnace slag. Each block is about 5 feet (1.5 m) long by 4 feet (1.2 m) high and 4 feet (1.2 m) thick, and has a central hole of about 6 inches (150 mm) diameter.	II
West View; 52.63042°N 2.48708°W	—	Mid 19th century	A house in painted brick with a tile roof, two storeys and three bays. The middle bay projects forward, it is gabled with a finial, and has pilasters and a doorway with a segmental head and a triple keyblock. The windows are casements and also have segmental heads, the window above the door has a triple keyblock, and the other windows have hood moulds.	II
Woodbury; 52.64064°N 2.49021°W	—	Mid 19th century	A russet brick house with bracketed eaves and a hipped tile roof. There are two storeys, three bays, and a two-bay projecting wing on the left. The doorway has pilasters, a rectangular fanlight and a small cornice. The windows are sashes with cast iron saddleback lintels.	II
Holy Trinity Church; 52.63696°N 2.48826°W		1850–54	The church, designed by Reeves and Voysey in Decorated style, is built in buff sandstone. It consists of a nave, north and south aisles, a chancel with a south chapel, and a southwest tower. The tower incorporates a porch, there is an octagonal stair turret, and an embattled parapet.	II*
Churchyard wall, railings and gates, Holy Trinity Church; 52.63737°N 2.48887°W		c. 1850–54	A low, stepped wall extends along the northeast side of the churchyard with stone piers and ornamental cast iron railings. At the west and east ends are cast iron gates, those at the east end under an archway.	II
The Boy and Swan Fountain; 52.64005°N 2.49278°W	—	c. 1851	A fountain in cast iron cast for The Great Exhibition of 1851. It is ornate, and depicts a boy and a swan on an upper basin on a round pedestal in the centre of a circular water-filled lower basin.	II
Wesleyan Infant School; 52.62850°N 2.47611°W		1858	The school is in buff brick with decoration in polychromic brick, and a patterned tile roof, and is in Gothic style. The windows are mullioned with pointed heads, facing the road is a machicolated gable, and to the right is a tower with pointed-arched openings and a pyramidal tiled roof. Incorporated at the east end is a schoolmaster's house.	II
Church of England School; 52.62842°N 2.48226°W	—	1859	The school is in blue brick with stone dressings, quoins, a tile roof, and two storeys. On the south side are two gabled wings, and a three-storey gabled porch. The windows are mullioned and transomed, most with lattice glazing.	II
Coalbrookdale Institute; 52.63552°N 2.48851°W		1859	Originally a literary and scientific institute, later used as a youth hostel, it is in black brick with yellow brick dressings and a slate mansard roof. There are two storeys, seven bays, the outer and middle bays projecting slightly, and a one-bay wing on the left. In the centre is a yellow brick porch with a depressed arch and above it is a circular window. The other windows are casements with hood moulds, and there are flat-headed dormers.	II*
Railings, gates and war memorial, Coalbrookdale Institute; 52.63563°N 2.48916°W		c. 1859	At the entrance to the grounds are cast iron railings on dwarf brick walls, four cast iron gate piers with quatrefoil sections and spearhead finials, and ornate cast iron gates. The war memorial consists of an obelisk with a cross.	II
Woodland Grange; 52.62978°N 2.48044°W	—	c. 1860	A buff brick house with a hipped tile roof. There are two storeys, three bays, the middle bay projecting and gabled, a recessed single-bay wing on the left, and rear extensions. The doorway has a moulded surround with pilasters, panelled reveals, a rectangular fanlight, and a pedimented hood on consoles. The windows are sashes with segmental cast iron lintels.	II
Railway Level Crossing Gates near Calcutts House; 52.62454°N 2.46715°W		c. 1862	The level crossing was built by the Severn Valley Railway, and is now closed at this point. Surviving are a pair of braced wooden gates on large strap hinges attached to circular cast iron gate posts.	II
St Mary's Church; 52.62352°N 2.46324°W		1863	The church was designed by Sir Arthur Blomfield, it is built in polychromic brick, and has a roof of fish-scale tiles. The church consists of a nave with a gabled south porch, a north transept with a small semicircular apse, a south transept, and a chancel with a polygonal apse. Rising from the south transept is a slim tower with a square bottom stage, octagonal above, and a conical spire on eight short columns. At the west end is a wheel window, and the windows in the chancel are lancets.	II
Paradise Villa; 52.63409°N 2.48931°W		Mid to late 19th century	A house in Gothic style, in buff brick with dressings in red and blue brick, and a tile roof. There are two storeys, and attic and a basement. To the right is a gabled wing containing a two-storey canted bay window. There is a porch in the angle, and above it is a small gable containing a trefoiled opening. To the left is a lower two-storey wing, and the windows are casements, most with pointed heads.	II
The New School House; 52.64062°N 2.49166°W	—	Mid to late 19th century	Originally a school, later used for other purposes, it is in brick with a tile roof, and has gable ends with ornamental bargeboards. There are two storeys and four bays. The windows are two-light mullioned and transomed casements, with segmental heads, and moulded hood moulds.	II
Albert Edward Bridge; 52.63090°N 2.50295°W		1863	The bridge was built to carry a railway over the River Severn, and consists of a single segmental girder arch. It is in cast iron, and has 20th-century steel parapets, and brown brick abutments with yellow brick angle quoins. On the bridge are inscribed plates.	II
Wall in front of 42 and 43 Darby Road; 52.64190°N 2.49467°W	—	Mid to late 19th century	The wall is in ashlar stone with vermiculated rustication, a stone balustrade, and contains a four-centred archway.	II
Lincoln Grange; 52.63192°N 2.48199°W	—	1871–75	A workhouse, later a hospital, it is in buff brick with decoration in polychromic brick, and the roof is slated. The building consists of an entrance front, ward wings in an H-shaped plan, and a central range with kitchens and the dining room. The entrance front has a central range of two storeys and three bays with a central gateway and gabled half-dormers. The flanking ranges contain sash windows. In the south front is a clock with a louvred turret.	II
Warehouse, The Wharfage; 52.62920°N 2.49026°W		Late 19th century	The warehouse is in red brick, and partly painted, There are three storeys, the gable end facing the road with three bays. In the middle bay are loading doors in each floor, above which is a hoist with a canopy, and there is a circular window in the gable apex. In the outer bays and side walls are rectangular windows.	II
Erecting shop and Assembly shops, Coalbrookdale Ironworks; 52.63840°N 2.49211°W	—	1879	The erecting shop was enlarged in 1883–86. It is in red brick with white brick dressings, a sill band, an eaves cornice, and a hipped tile roof. There is a single storey and 16 bays, each bay containing a round-headed multi-pane cast iron window. At the north end is a sliding door, and at the south end is a lower compressor house.	II
Former Wesleyan Chapel; 52.63833°N 2.49120°W		1885–86	The chapel is in red brick with a slate roof and is in Italianate style. The windows are round-headed with keyblocks. The entrance front has three storeys and five bays, the middle three bays projecting under a pediment with a finial. The lower two storeys project further to form a porch with a round-headed doorway in the ground floor and three windows above. The top floor contains three larger windows.	II
Long warehouse, Coalbrookdale Ironworks; 52.63951°N 2.49252°W	—	c. 1890	The warehouse, later part of a museum, is in red brick with a tile roof and gable ends clad in asbestos sheet. It has a long rectangular plan, three storeys, and 16 bays. The ground floor is open and has a long iron girder carried on cast iron columns. The multi-pane cast iron window have segmental heads.	II
Lamp post, Dale End; 52.63235°N 2.49319°W		1897	The lamp post, which was cast by the Coalbrookdale Company, is in cast iron. It has a fluted round shaft on a round pedestal, and a capital in Corinthian style. It is one of a pair erected to celebrate the Diamond Jubilee of Queen Victoria.	II
Lamp post, Wellington Road; 52.63839°N 2.49172°W		1897	The lamp post, which was cast by the Coalbrookdale Company, is in cast iron. It has a fluted round shaft on a round pedestal, and a capital in Corinthian style.	II
The Vicarage; 52.63596°N 2.48732°W	—	1901	The vicarage is in red brick with stone dressings and a tile roof. There are two storeys and an attic, and on the front are two projecting gabled bays. There are mullioned and transomed windows in the right bay and the centre, and other windows are sashes. The doorway has a depressed arch, a moulded surround, and a scrolled hood mould.	II
Ironbridge War Memorial; 52.62768°N 2.48499°W		1924	The war memorial consists of a bronze statue by Arthur George Walker on a plinth of Cornish granite with bronze plaques. The statue depicts a soldier in battledress standing and leaning on the muzzle of his rifle. The plinth is square and has a frieze and a domed top, and stands on a platform of three steps. The plaques carry inscriptions and the names of those lost in the two World Wars.	II
K6 Telephone kiosk, Belmont Road; 52.62900°N 2.48040°W	—	1935	A K6 type telephone kiosk, designed by Giles Gilbert Scott. Constructed in cast iron with a square plan and a dome, it has three unperforated crowns in the top panels.	II
