= Thomas Rolt (gentleman) =

English gentleman 1641-1672

Thomas Rolt FRS
- Born: 1641; Milton Ernest, Bedfordshire
- Died: 1672
- Education: St Catharine's College, Cambridge
- Awards: Fellow of the Royal Society (1664)

Thomas Rolt FRS (January 1641 – October 1672) was an English gentleman, and Fellow of the Royal Society.

== Life ==
Rolt was born in Milton Ernest, Bedfordshire in January 1641. He was the son of landowner Sir John (d. 1651) and Lady Anne Rolt (née Barnardiston; ca. 1617-1691), from the manor of Milton Ernest. Rolt had a sister, Elhanna, who later married Thomas D'Aeth.

Rolt matriculated at St Catharine's College, Cambridge in 1660, where he had the status of Fellow Commoner. In 1662, Rolt leased Milton Ernest manor to his maternal uncle, Nathaniel Barnardiston. He was admitted to the Middle Temple in 1663.

In 1664, he married Mary Coxe, daughter of Thomas Coxe FRS, physician to Charles II. Rolt was admitted as a Fellow of the Royal Society in December 1664, having been proposed for election by his father-in-law, Thomas Coxe.

Little is known of Rolt’s life. Rolt and his wife had three children, the youngest of whom, Samuel, was born in 1671. After Rolt’s death in October 1672, his widow, Mary, married Rolt's namesake Thomas Rolt, who was an official with the East India Company, and later Governor of Bombay.

Rolt's son Samuel Rolt (1671-1717) was later MP for Bedford.
