= Paul baronets of Rodborough (first creation, 1762) =

Escutcheon of the Paul baronets of Rodborough

The Paul baronetcy of Rodborough in the County of Gloucester was created in the Baronetage of Great Britain on 3 September 1762 for the clothier Onesiphorus Paul. He was in business at Woodchester, and was High Sheriff of Gloucestershire in 1760. The 2nd Baronet was a philanthropist and prison reformer and also served as High Sheriff of Gloucestershire, in 1780. The title became extinct on his death in 1820.

== Paul baronets, of Rodborough (1762) ==
- Sir Onesiphorus Paul, 1st Baronet (c. 1705–1774)
- Sir George Onesiphorus Paul, 2nd Baronet (1746–1820)

== Notes ==
Baronetage of Great Britain
Preceded by Bayntun-Rolt baronets	Paul baronets of Rodborough; 3 September 1762	Succeeded by Dundas baronets
