= Edward Rolt =

British Member of Parliament (died 1722)

Edward Rolt (c. 1686–1722) of Sacombe Park, Hertfordshire, Harrowby Hall, Lincolnshire and Spye Park, near Chippenham, Wiltshire, was a British landowner and Tory politician who sat in the House of Commons from 1713 to 1722.

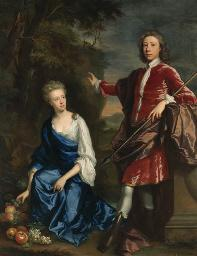
Edward and Constantia Rolt

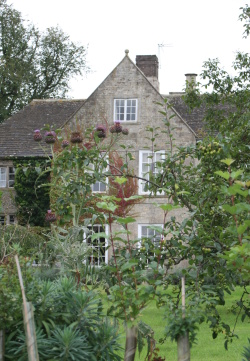
Harrowby Hall

Rolt was the only son of Sir Thomas Rolt of Sacombe and Harrowby and his wife Mary Cox, daughter of Dr Thomas Coxe of Christ Church, London, physician in ordinary to Charles II. Rolt's father was in the service of the East India Company at Surat, and became chief in Persia and president of Surat before he returned to England in 1682 with a large fortune and purchased Sacombe Park. Rolt matriculated at Merton College, Oxford on 7 November 1701, aged 15 and was admitted at Lincoln's Inn on 14 October 1702. He married Anne Bayntun, daughter. of Henry Bayntun of Spye Park in about 1708. He succeeded his father to Sacombe and Harrowby in 1710.

Rolt was returned unopposed as Tory Member of Parliament for St Mawes at the 1713 British general election on the recommendation of Francis Scobell, He made little recorded contribution in Parliament, although in March and April 1714 he helped manage a bill for the repair of a Wiltshire road.

Rolt was returned in a contest at the 1715 British general election as Tory MP for Grantham, where he owned property. He voted against the Government, except when he was absent on the septennial bill.. He is reported as having accepted £5,000 stock from the South Sea Company on 1 March 1720, and another £800 on 23 March. He was defeated at Grantham at the 1722 British general election, but was returned for Chippenham, where his wife had inherited an estate said to be worth nearly £3,000 a year from her brother John Bayntun in 1716.

Rolt died of smallpox at Bath on 22 December 1722. He left six sons and two daughters including Edward who became a baronet. His widow married in 1724 the 13th Lord Somerville and had further issue, two sons and one daughter. Rolt's mother had been previously married to Thomas Rolt of Milton Ernest Bedfordshire, making Rolt the half brother of Samuel Rolt.

Parliament of Great Britain
Preceded by John Anstis; Sir Richard Onslow	Member of Parliament for St Mawes; 1713– 1715; With: Francis Scobell	Succeeded by William Lowndes; John Chetwynd
Preceded by Sir John Thorold; Sir John Brownlow	Member of Parliament for Grantham; 1715–1722; With: John Heathcote	Succeeded by Francis Fisher; The Viscount Tyrconnel
Preceded by Sir John Eyles; Giles Earle	Member of Parliament for Chippenham; 1722; With: Sir John Eyles	Succeeded by Sir John Eyles; Thomas Boucher
