= Thomas Coxe =

Physician among initial fellows of Royal Society

Thomas Coxe (1615 – 1685) was an English physician. He studied at Emmanuel College, Cambridge, graduating with a BA in 1635 and an MA in 1638. He was among the initial fellows of the Royal Society, but ran into money difficulties in old age.

== Life ==
The son of Thomas Coxe, he was born in Somerset. He was educated at Emmanuel College, Cambridge, where he matriculated in 1633, graduating BA in 1635, and MA in 1638. He took his MD degree at Padua 12 December 1641, and was later incorporated at Oxford, in 1646.

A physician in the parliamentary army during the First English Civil War, Coxe is supposed to have pointed Thomas Sydenham in the direction of medicine while attending his brother. He associated with the Hartlib circle. He also visited Sarah Wight, one of Henry Jessey's congregation, who undertook a 75-day fast in 1647, and was then connected with radical religious groups.

Coxe became a fellow of the College of Physicians on 25 June 1649. Around 1655, he took on the Puritan John Janeway as a tutor in his household, a short-lived post. In the later 1650s he was in touch with Henry Oldenburg at Oxford. He contributed to Robert Boyle's unpublished Essay of Poisons of this period. Early in 1658 he was consulted by the family of Robert Rich, 3rd Earl of Warwick on the Earl's health; Coxe summoned Richard Wiseman, who pronounced that Warwick was not in danger. In 1660 he delivered the Harveian oration, and in 1662 was on the first list of Fellows nominated by the council of the Royal Society.

From 1676 to 1680 Coxe was Treasurer of the College of Physicians and in 1682 elected its president. Coxe, with Edward Alston and John Micklethwaite, ensured the college took a generous line in licensing nonconformist ministers to practice medicine. As a close friend of William Waller, Coxe acted as executor of his will, which included legacies to Thomas Case and Gabriel Sangar. While Coxe became a physician to Charles II in 1665, his views were unpopular and his presidency of the college in the 1680s lasted only one year, as he was marked out as an early Whig. One of his acts as president was to order the printing, unusual at this period, of lectures of Walter Charleton, covering the theories of Giovanni Alfonso Borelli on the heart, but without due acknowledgement.

Coxe ran into difficulties in his old age, and avoiding his creditors, died of apoplexy in France in 1685.

== Works ==
From 1665 a group in the Royal Society followed up the possibility of blood transfusion, at the suggestion of John Wilkins; Coxe worked first on pigeons. After a demonstration with Edmund King in November 1666, Coxe, in Philosophical Transactions for 1667, reported on a transfusion experiment carried out on dogs, from a spaniel to a mongrel. The language of the paper was later picked up in The Virtuoso by Thomas Shadwell.

== Family ==
Coxe's son Thomas was also a Cambridge graduate and physician. His daughter Mary married Thomas Rolt of Milton Ernest, and was mother of the Member of Parliament Samuel Rolt. She then married Sir Thomas Rolt of Sacombe and was mother of Edward Rolt, also an MP. Richard Baxter published in 1680 his funeral sermon for Coxe's wife, Mary. In the dedicatory epistle Baxter clarifies that he was one of Coxe's patients.

== Notes ==
Attribution

This article incorporates text from a publication now in the public domain: Stephen, Leslie, ed. (1887). "Coxe, Thomas". Dictionary of National Biography. Vol. 12. London: Smith, Elder & Co.
