= Henry Bayntun (died 1691) =

English politician

Henry Bayntun (17 December 1664 – June 1691) was an English politician who sat in the House of Commons between 1685 and 1691.

Bayntun was the son of Sir Edward Bayntun and his wife Stuarta Thynne daughter of Sir Thomas Thynne (cir 1610-1669).

Bayntun was elected Member of Parliament MP for Chippenham in 1685 and sat until 1690. He was then elected MP for Calne in 1690 and sat until his death in 1691.

During the 1680s Henry Bayntun purchased Hinton Priory, Farleigh Hungerford Castle and surrounding estates from Sir Edward Hungerford.

Parliament of England
Preceded by Sir George Speke; Sir Edward Hungerford	Member of Parliament for Chippenham; 1685–1690; With: Sharington Talbot 1685; Richard Kent 1685–1689; Nicholas Bayntun 1689–1690	Succeeded by Richard Kent; Alexander Popham
Preceded by Henry Chivers; Lionel Duckett	Member of Parliament for Calne; 1690–1691; With: Henry Chivers	Succeeded by Henry Chivers; William Wyndham
