= Thomas Rolt =

British official of the East India Company

Sir Thomas Rolt (c.1631–1710) was a British official of the East India Company, President of Surat and Governor of Bombay from 1677 to 1681. His father was Edward Rolt of Pertenhall in Bedfordshire; his mother was Edward Rolt's second wife Mary, a daughter of Sir Oliver Cromwell.

Rolt began his career at the Surat factory of the Company, and was a writer from 1658. He moved to Persia where he was the local chief, agent on the Persian Gulf from 1671 to 1677. During his period as President of Surat, the Company ordered him to cut back expenditure. Rolt pursued a policy that aimed to be even-handed with respect to the Marathas and the Siddis of Gujarat, which brought him criticism from Richard Keigwin.

In 1682 Rolt returned to England with a fortune. He bought the manor of Sacombe in Hertfordshire in 1688, from Sir John Gore. In the vestry of Sacombe Church, there is a memorial to Rolt, who died in 1710, and to his wife, who died in 1716.

== Family ==
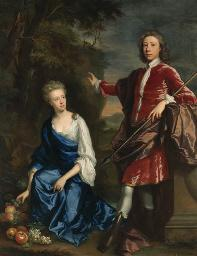
Edward and Constantia Rolt

Rolt married Mary, daughter of Thomas Coxe. Edward Rolt the Member of Parliament was their son. Their daughter Constantia married John Kyrle Ernle. The marriage also made Rolt stepfather of Samuel Rolt, another Member of Parliament, and the son of Thomas Rolt of Milton Ernest.
