= List of museums in Shropshire =

This list of museums in Shropshire, England contains museums which are defined for this context as institutions (including nonprofit organizations, government entities, and private businesses) that collect and care for objects of cultural, artistic, scientific, or historical interest and make their collections or related exhibits available for public viewing. Also included are non-profit art galleries and university art galleries. Museums that exist only in cyberspace (i.e., virtual museums) are not included.

Name	Image	Town/City	Region	Type	Summary
Acton Scott Heritage Farm		Acton Scott	Shropshire	Farm	Victorian period working farm
Attingham Park		Atcham	Shropshire	Historic house	Operated by the National Trust, late 18th century country mansion, gardens
Battlefield 1403		Battlefield	Shropshire	Military	site and history of the Battle of Shrewsbury, near Battlefield Heritage Park
Benthall Hall		Benthall, Broseley	Shropshire	Historic house	Operated by the National Trust, 16th century country house, gardens
Bishop's Castle Railway and Transport Museum		Bishop's Castle	Shropshire	Transportation	History of the Bishop's Castle Railway
Blists Hill Victorian Town		Madeley	Telford and Wrekin	Living	Operated by the National Trust, late 19th century period Victorian town, includes steam-operated pithead, chemist, squatters cottage, schoolhouse and a bank, formerly one of the Ironbridge Gorge Museums.
Bog Visitor Centre		Stiperstones	Shropshire	Local	natural history, geology and mining heritage of the area
Boscobel House		Boscobel	Shropshire	Historic house	Operated by English Heritage, restored 17th century timber-framed house and farm, site where Charles II famously hid in a tree to escape discovery by Parliamentary soldiers after the Battle of Worcester, includes dairy, farmyard, smithy, gardens, and a descendant of The Royal Oak
Bridgnorth Museum		Bridgnorth	Shropshire	Local	Local history, culture
Broseley Pipeworks		Broseley	Telford and Wrekin	Industry	Operated by the National Trust, former clay tobacco pipe making factory, previously one of the Ironbridge Gorge Museums
Cambrian Heritage Railways		Oswestry	Shropshire	Railway	Heritage railway and museum
Clun Town Museum		Clun	Shropshire	Local	information, local history and town regalia, located in town hall
Coalbrookdale Museum of Iron		Coalbrookdale	Telford and Wrekin	Industry	Operated by the National Trust, 17th century ironworks, previously one of the Ironbridge Gorge Museums, includes museum of steel sculpture.
Coalport China Museum		Coalport	Telford and Wrekin	Industry	Operated by the National Trust, history and production of Coalport chinaware, previously one of the Ironbridge Gorge Museums
Coleham Pumping Station		Coleham	Shropshire	Technology	Victorian pumping station with preserved steam engines
Daniels Mill		Bridgnorth	Shropshire	Mill	18th century working water mill
Darby Houses		Coalbrookdale	Telford and Wrekin	Historic house	Operated by the National Trust, 17th century period homes of the Quaker managers of the Coalbrookdale Ironworks; previously one of the Ironbridge Gorge Museums
Dudmaston Hall		Quatt	Shropshire	Historic house	Operated by the National Trust, 17th century country mansion and estate, gardens, features important collection of modern art and mid-20th century Spanish paintings and pottery
Engine House		Highley	Shropshire	Railway	Severn Valley Railway visitor center with steam locomotives and railway exhibits, located at the Highley railway station
Enginuity		Coalbrookdale	Telford and Wrekin	Science	Operated by the National Trust, principles of design and technology in industry and manufacturing, previously one of the Ironbridge Gorge Museums
House on Crutches Museum		Bishop's Castle	Shropshire	Local	timber-framed house with local history, domestic and agriculture exhibits
Iron Bridge and Toll House		Ironbridge	Telford and Wrekin	Technology	Toll House operated by the National Trust. First arch bridge in the world to be made out of cast iron in 1779, toll house features exhibits on the bridge's construction, previously one of the Ironbridge Gorge Museums.
Jackfield Tile Museum		Jackfield, Broseley	Shropshire	Art	Operated by the National Trust, decorative tile factory, galleries showing tiles and period rooms decorated with tiles, previously one of the Ironbridge Gorge Museums.
Llanymynech Heritage Area		Llanymynech	Shropshire	Industrial history	Historic lime quarry and industrial buildings, including nationally significant Hoffman kiln – one of three still standing in Britain
Ludlow Castle		Ludlow	Shropshire	Historic house	Partly ruined uninhabited medieval castle
Ludlow Museum		Ludlow	Shropshire	Multiple	local history, wildlife, archaeology, geology, fossils
Market Drayton Museum		Market Drayton	Shropshire	Local	local history
Merrythought		Ironbridge	Telford and Wrekin	Toy museum	Situated at the last remaining British teddy bear manufacturer, Merrythought, who are based in the Ironbridge Gorge
Morville Hall		Bridgnorth	Shropshire	Historic house	Operated by the National Trust, Elizabethan house and gardens
Much Wenlock Museum		Much Wenlock	Shropshire	Local	local history including the Wenlock Olympian Society Annual Games
Museum of the Gorge		Ironbridge	Telford and Wrekin	Local	Operated by the National Trust, history of the Ironbridge Gorge, coal mining and local history, previously one of the Ironbridge Gorge Museums
Mythstories Museum of Myth & Fable		Wem	Shropshire	Literary	changing displays of legends and folklore, live storytelling
Oswestry Town Museum		Oswestry	Shropshire	Local	The Story of Oswestry
Park Hall		Oswestry	Shropshire	Multiple	farm park with three museums: Victorian School & Museum, Welsh Guards Museum, and reproduction Iron Age Roundhouse
Royal Air Force Museum Cosford		Cosford	Shropshire	Aviation	History of aviation and the Royal Air Force, features war planes, transport and training aircraft, engines, missiles and rocket-powered weapons, exhibits on changes in air technology, Cold War history
Shrewsbury Museum and Art Gallery		Shrewsbury	Shropshire	Multiple	Local history, art exhibits
Soldiers of Shropshire Museum		Shrewsbury	Shropshire	Military	Regimental memorabilia and history, located at Shrewsbury Castle
Shropshire Hills Discovery Centre		Craven Arms	Shropshire	Multiple	Area geology, natural history, Iron Age history, art exhibits, local history
Stokesay Castle		Stokesay	Shropshire	Historic house	Operated by English Heritage, unusually well preserved medieval fortified manor house
Stokesay Court		Onibury	Shropshire	Historic house	Victorian country house and gardens
Sunnycroft		Wellington	Telford and Wrekin	Historic house	Operated by the National Trust, Victorian suburban villa with unaltered late 19th century interior
Tar Tunnel		Coalport	Telford and Wrekin	Industry	Tunnel where bitumen seeps through, one of the Ironbridge Gorge Museums
Welsh Guards Museum		Oswestry	Shropshire	Military	history and memorabilia of the Welsh Guards, located in Park Hall
Whitchurch Heritage Centre		Whitchurch	Shropshire	Local	exploring the history of a Shropshire market town, features gallery with art and memorabilia relating to artist Randolph Caldecott and Whitchurch-born musician Edward German
Wilderhope Manor		Wenlock Edge	Shropshire	Historic house	Operated by the National Trust, 16th century Tudor manor house, also a youth hostel
Wroxeter Roman City		Wroxeter	Shropshire	Archaeology	Operated by English Heritage, excavated remains and museum with artifacts

== See also ==
- Category:Tourist attractions in Shropshire
- Ironbridge Gorge Museum Trust
