= Robert de Beuleu =

14th-century English politician

Robert de Beuleu (fl. 1313) was an English politician. He sat as MP for Bridgnorth in 1313, alongside William Panning.

He was probably the "Robert de Bellem" whose land was escheated in Broseley in 1349.
