= Ironbridge =

Village in Shropshire, England

Coordinates: 52°37′40″N 2°29′06″W

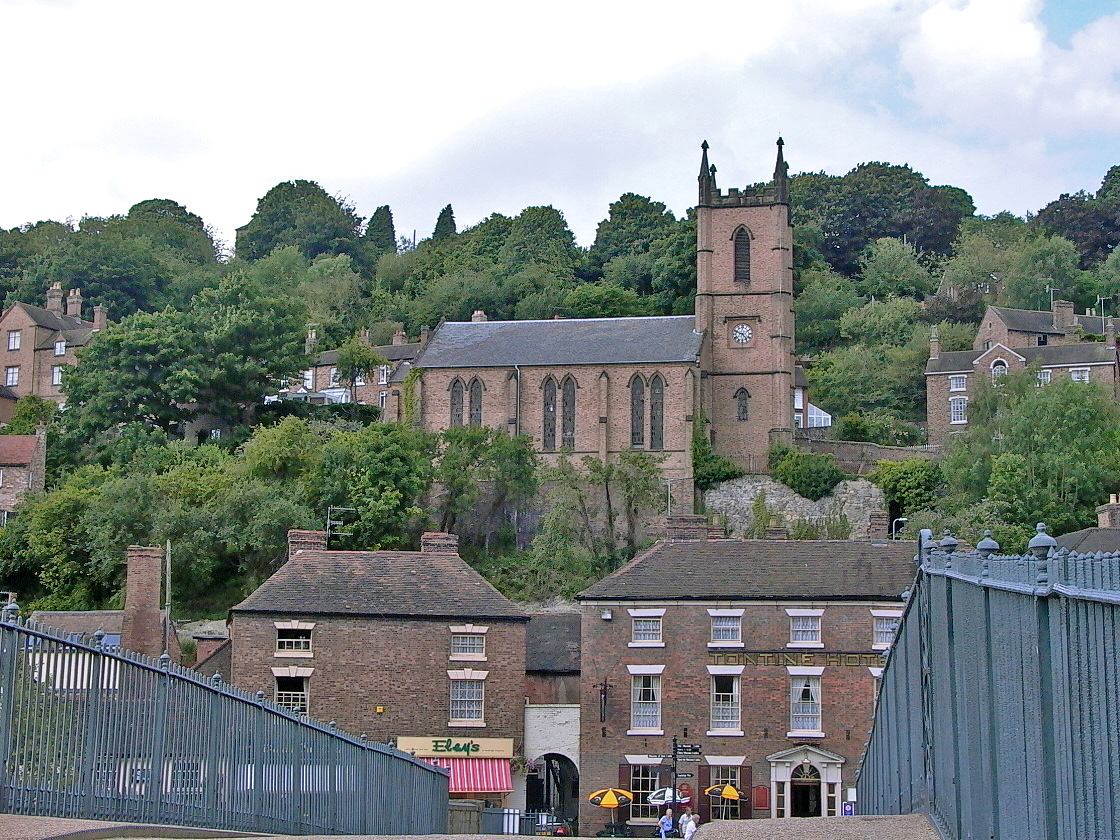
- Ironbridge, seen from the Iron Bridge

- Location within Shropshire
- Population: 2,582 (2011)
- OS grid reference: SJ6724903350
  - London: 126 mi (203 km) SE
- Civil parish: The Gorge
- Unitary authority: Telford and Wrekin
- Ceremonial county: Shropshire
- Region: West Midlands
- Country: England
- Sovereign state: United Kingdom
- Post town: TELFORD
- Postcode district: TF8
- Dialling code: 01952
- Police: West Mercia
- Fire: Shropshire
- Ambulance: West Midlands
- UK Parliament: Telford

Ironbridge is a riverside village in the borough of Telford and Wrekin, Shropshire, England. Located on the bank of the River Severn, at the heart of the Ironbridge Gorge, it lies in the civil parish of The Gorge. Ironbridge developed beside, and takes its name from, the Iron Bridge, a 100-foot (30 m) cast iron bridge that was built in 1779.

== History ==
The area around Ironbridge is described by those promoting it as a tourist destination as the "birthplace of the Industrial Revolution". This description is based on the idea that Abraham Darby perfected the technique of smelting iron with coke, in Coalbrookdale, allowing much cheaper production of iron. However, the industrial revolution did not begin in any one place. Darby's iron smelting was but one small part of this generalised revolution and was soon superseded by the great iron-smelting areas. However, the bridge – being the first of its kind fabricated from cast iron, and one of the few which have survived to the present day – remains an important symbol representative of the dawn of the industrial age.

The grandson of the first Abraham Darby, Abraham Darby III, built the bridge – originally designed by Thomas Farnolls Pritchard – to link the two areas. Construction began in 1777 and ended in 1779, spanning 2 years. The bridge opened on New Year's Day 1781. Soon afterwards the ancient Madeley market was relocated to the new purpose-built square and Georgian Butter Cross. The former dispersed settlement of Madeley Wood gained a planned urban focus as Ironbridge, the commercial and administrative centre of the Coalbrookdale coalfield.

The Iron Bridge proprietors also built the Tontine Hotel to accommodate visitors to the new bridge and the industrial sites of the Severn Gorge. Across a square facing the hotel, stands Ironbridge's war memorial, which was erected in 1924. It is a bronze statue of a First World War soldier in marching order, sculpted by Arthur George Walker, whose signature appears as does that of A.B. Burton, the foundry worker who erected it. On the hillside above the river are situated the stone-built 16th-century hunting lodge at Lincoln Hill, many 17th- and 18th-century workers' cottages, some imposing Georgian houses built by ironmasters and mine and river barge owners, and many early Victorian villas built from the various coloured bricks and tiles of the locality.

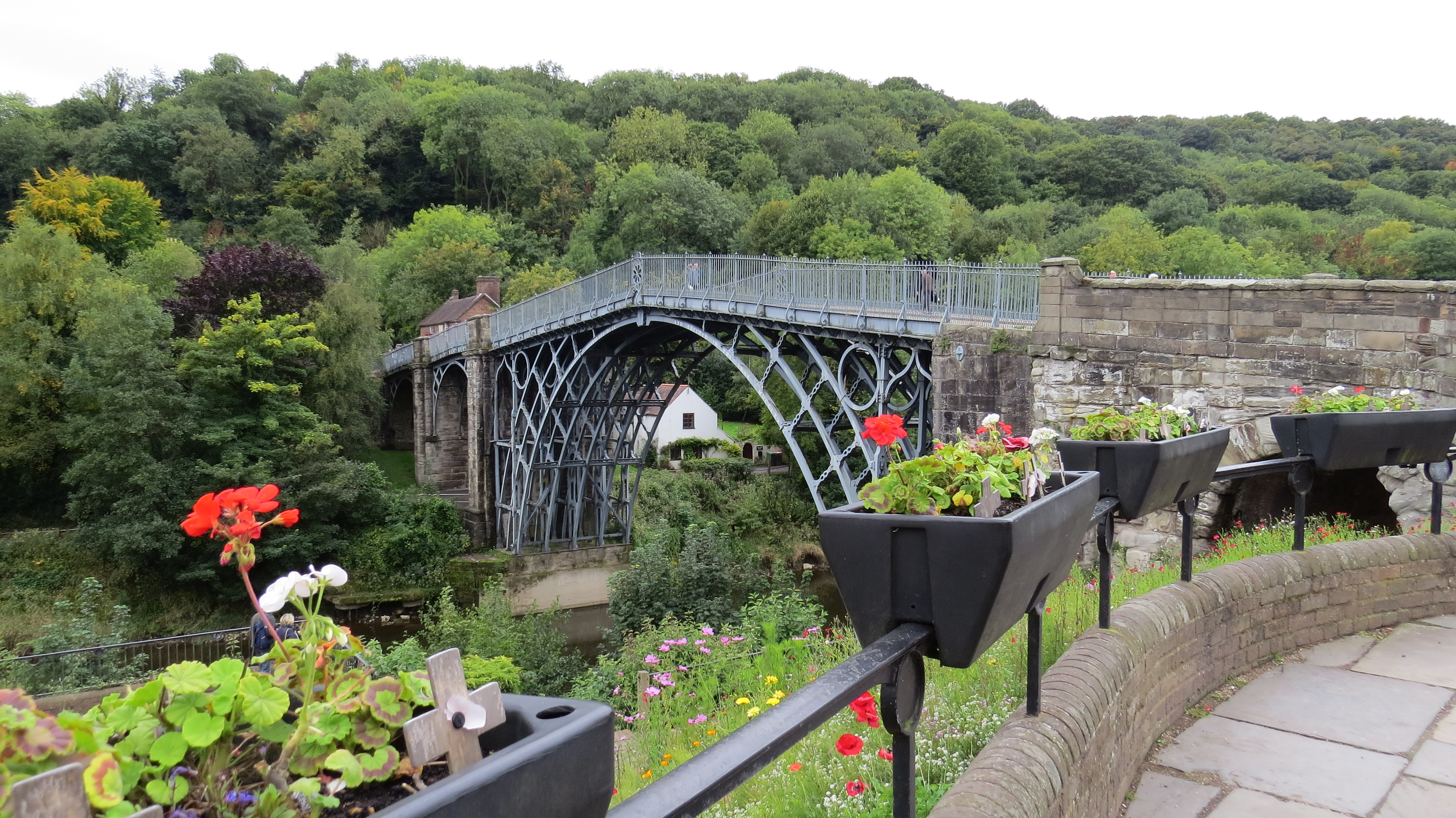
A view of the Iron Bridge in 2015 with its previous grey colour

St Luke's Church (1837) in simple Commissioners' Gothic by Samuel Smith of Madeley, has stained glass by David Evans of Shrewsbury. Its design is unusual in that the sanctuary is at the west-end and the tower at the east, in reverse to the majority of churches. This is because the land at the west-end was unstable and unable to take the weight of a tower. The bells in the church tower were installed in 1920 as a memorial to parishioners who died in the First World War, and the external church clock was illuminated in memory of those who died in the Second. The living was endowed as a rectory when the parish was created from Madeley in 1847, and is now a united benefice with Coalbrookdale and Little Wenlock, in the Diocese of Hereford.

The former Ironbridge and Broseley railway station, on the Severn Valley line (GWR) from Hartlebury to Shrewsbury, was situated on the south side of the Iron Bridge until 1966. Ironbridge was the birthplace of England National Football Team captain Billy Wright.

== Present day ==
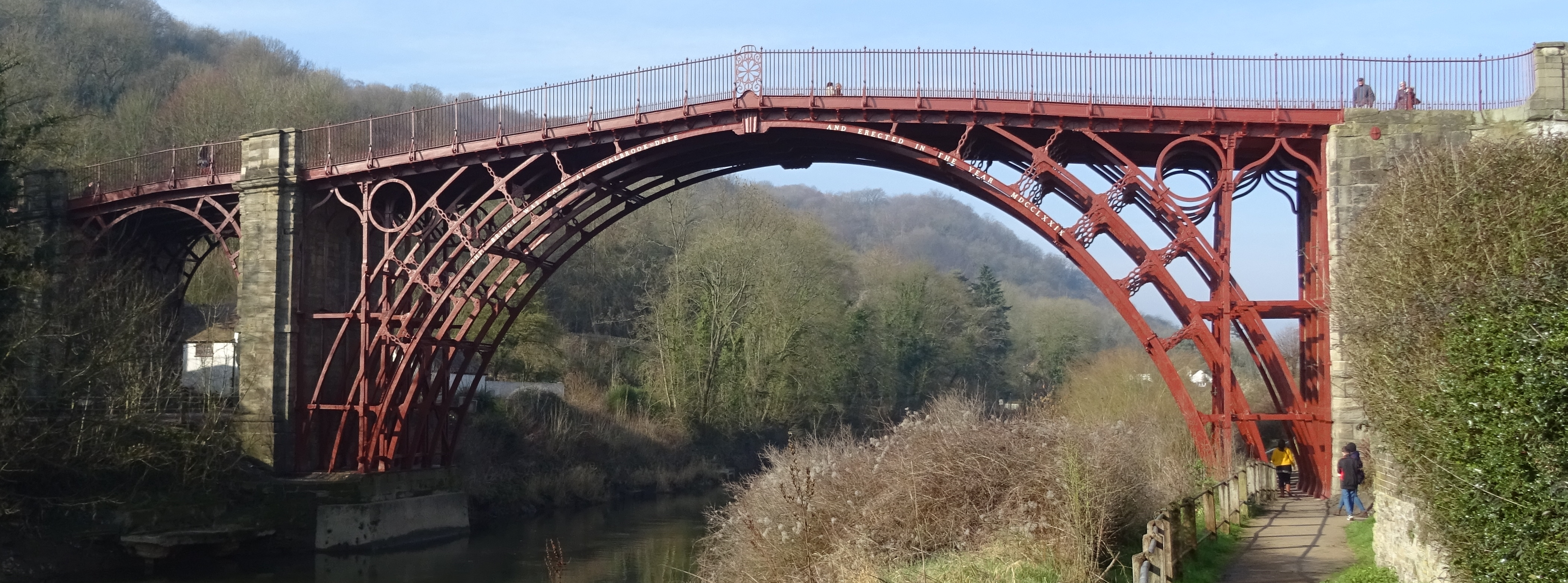
The Iron Bridge following the 2018 restoration

By the 19th century, Ironbridge had had many well-known visitors, including Benjamin Disraeli, but by the mid-20th century, the settlements and industries of the gorge were in decline. In 1986, though, Ironbridge became part of a UNESCO World Heritage Site (which covers the wider Ironbridge Gorge area) and has since become a major tourist attraction within Shropshire. Most industries in Ironbridge are now tourist-related; however, the Merrythought teddy bear company (established in 1930) is still manufacturing in Ironbridge and has a small museum there too. Amongst other things, the centre of Ironbridge is host to a post office, pharmacy, various pubs, cafés and many small independent shops.

Ironbridge was struck by an F1/T2 tornado on 23 November 1981, as part of the record-breaking nationwide tornado outbreak on that day. On Thursday 10 July 2003 The Queen and the Duke of Edinburgh made a visit to Shropshire which included a visit to Ironbridge, and a walk over the bridge itself.

An annual Coracle Regatta is held in August on the River Severn at Ironbridge, along with many other events throughout the year. This is mainly because the coracle-making family of Rogers lived in Ironbridge for several generations. Just outside Ironbridge in Coalbrookdale is the Ironbridge Institute, a partnership between the University of Birmingham and the Ironbridge Gorge Museum Trust offering postgraduate and professional development in heritage.

== Flooding ==
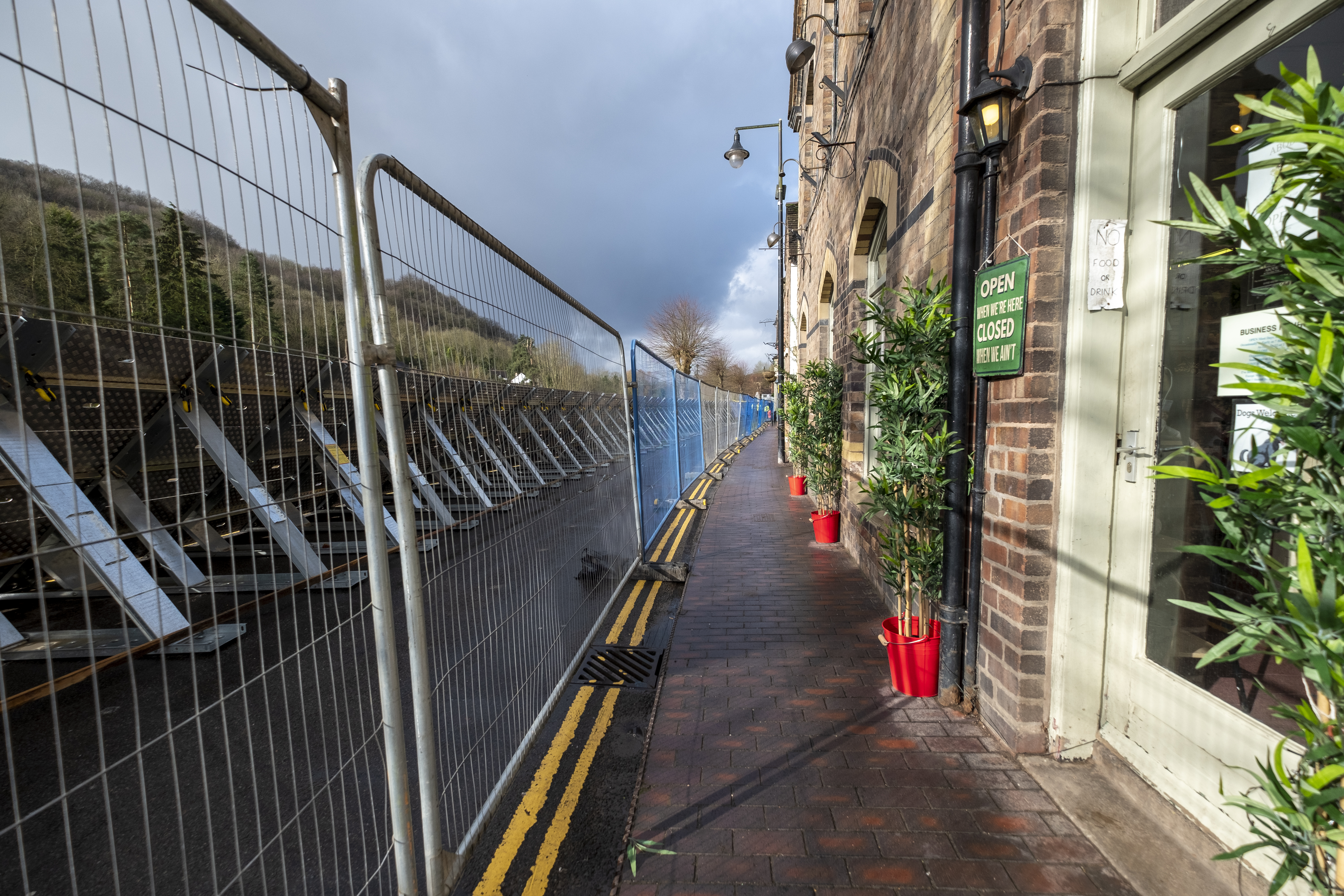
Barriers erected along the Wharfage

Ironbridge has an annually reoccurring problem of flooding from the River Severn, as do many other parts of Shropshire. Flooding has previously caused much damage and disruption to the Wharfage, which accommodates both The Swan and White Hart pubs, and various private homes. Starting in February 2004, DEFRA, in association with the Environment Agency, implemented a portable barrier which is erected at times of floods. At its peak, the flood water has reached a depth of one metre (3 ft 3 in) against the barrier.

On 26 February 2020, after large amounts of rainfall brought by storms Ciara and Dennis, the portable barrier was compromised; it required an evacuation of all residents from the wharfage. Ironbridge flooded again in February 2022.

== Notable people ==
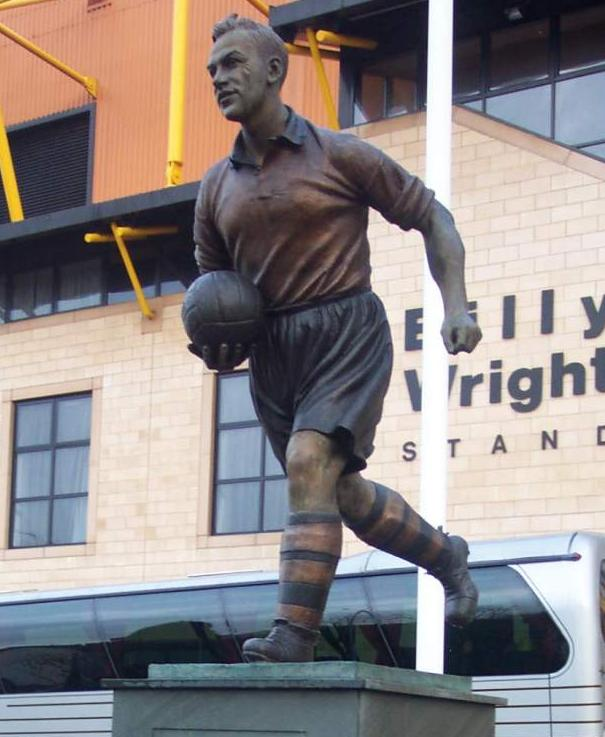
Statue of Billy Wright outside Molineux stadium

- The Rogers Family (1778-2003), known for building and using coracles on the River Severn for generations
- Thomas Parker (1843-1915), electrical engineer and inventor, had his last home at Severn House from 1908.
- George Sedgwick (1846–1934), a British trade union leader, born in Ironbridge.
- Billy Wright CBE (1924–1994), a footballer who played 490 games for Wolves and the first player to earn 100 international caps for England.
- Roger Squires (1932-2023), a British crossword compiler who lived in Ironbridge and holds the Guinness Book of Records title as the most prolific crossword compiler.
- Sir Neil Cossons OBE (born 1939), industrial archaeologist, lived at Ironbridge while director of Ironbridge Gorge Museum Trust.
- Ian Blakemore (born 1965), cricketer; left-handed batsman and left-arm slow bowler, played for Herefordshire
- Jay Blades MBE (born 1970), furniture restorer and television presenter, lived here early 2020s.
- Cancer (formed in 1988), a death/thrash metal band formed in Ironbridge, released 5 full-length albums

== The Ironbridge Gorge Museums ==
The Ironbridge Gorge Museum Trust owns and operates 10 museums throughout the Ironbridge Gorge World Heritage Site; they collectively tell the story of the Industrial Revolution.

The museums include:

- Blists Hill Victorian Town
- Coalport China Museum
- Tar Tunnel
- Jackfield Tile Museum
- Broseley Pipeworks
- The Iron Bridge Tollhouse
- Museum of The Gorge
- Coalbrookdale Museum of Iron
- The Darby Houses
- Enginuity

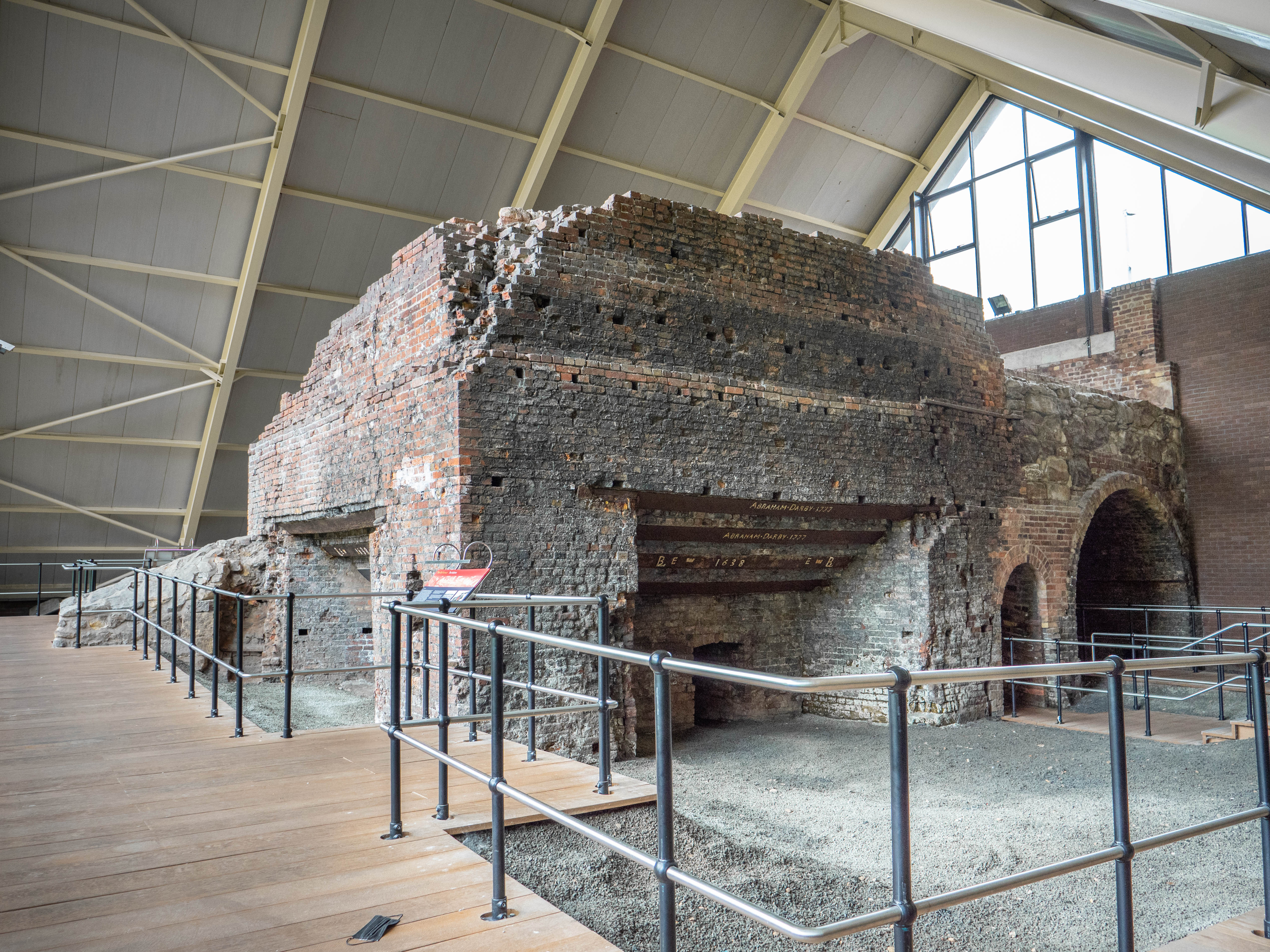
The Old Furnace, Coalbrookdale

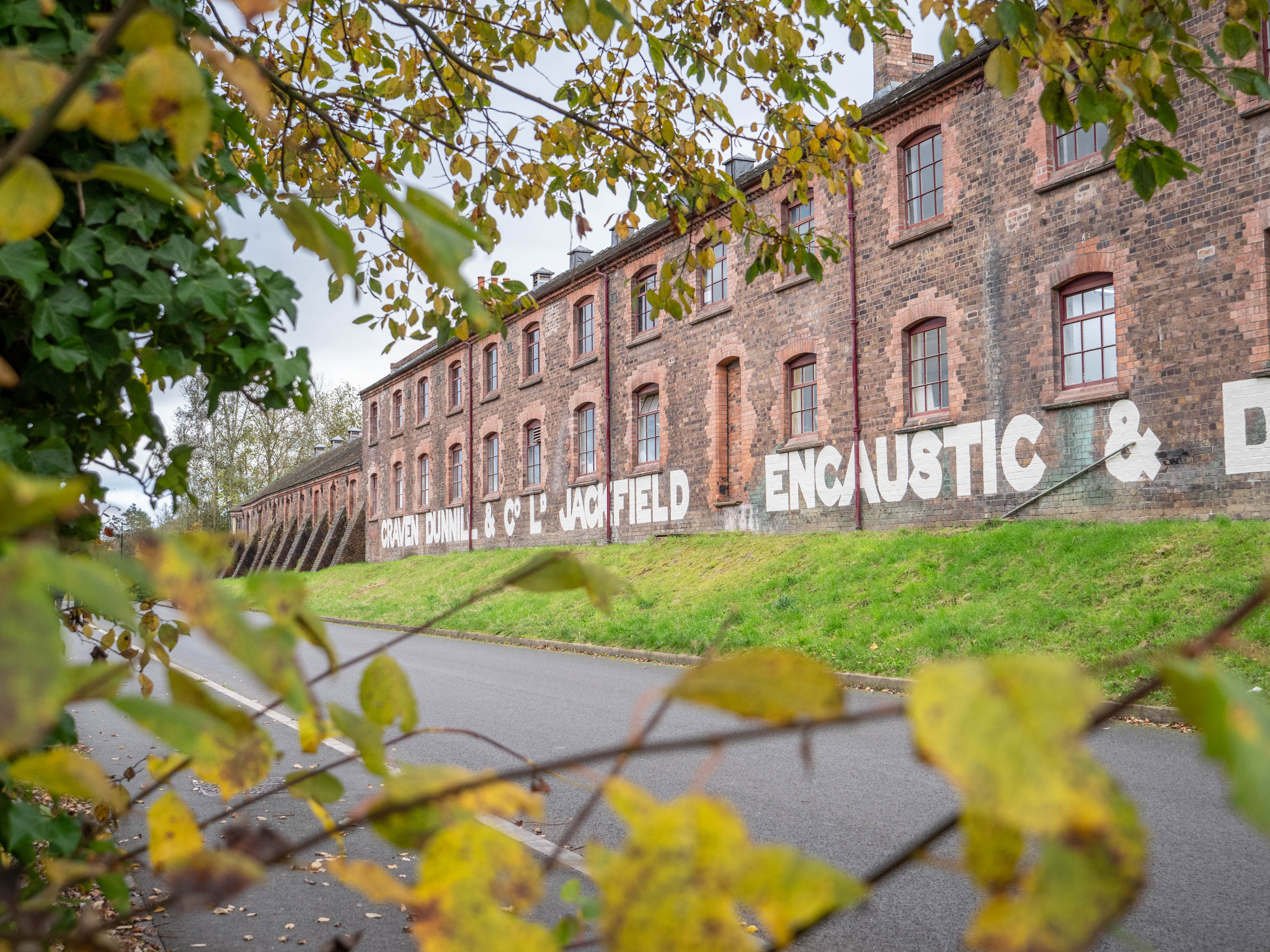
Jackfield Tile Museum

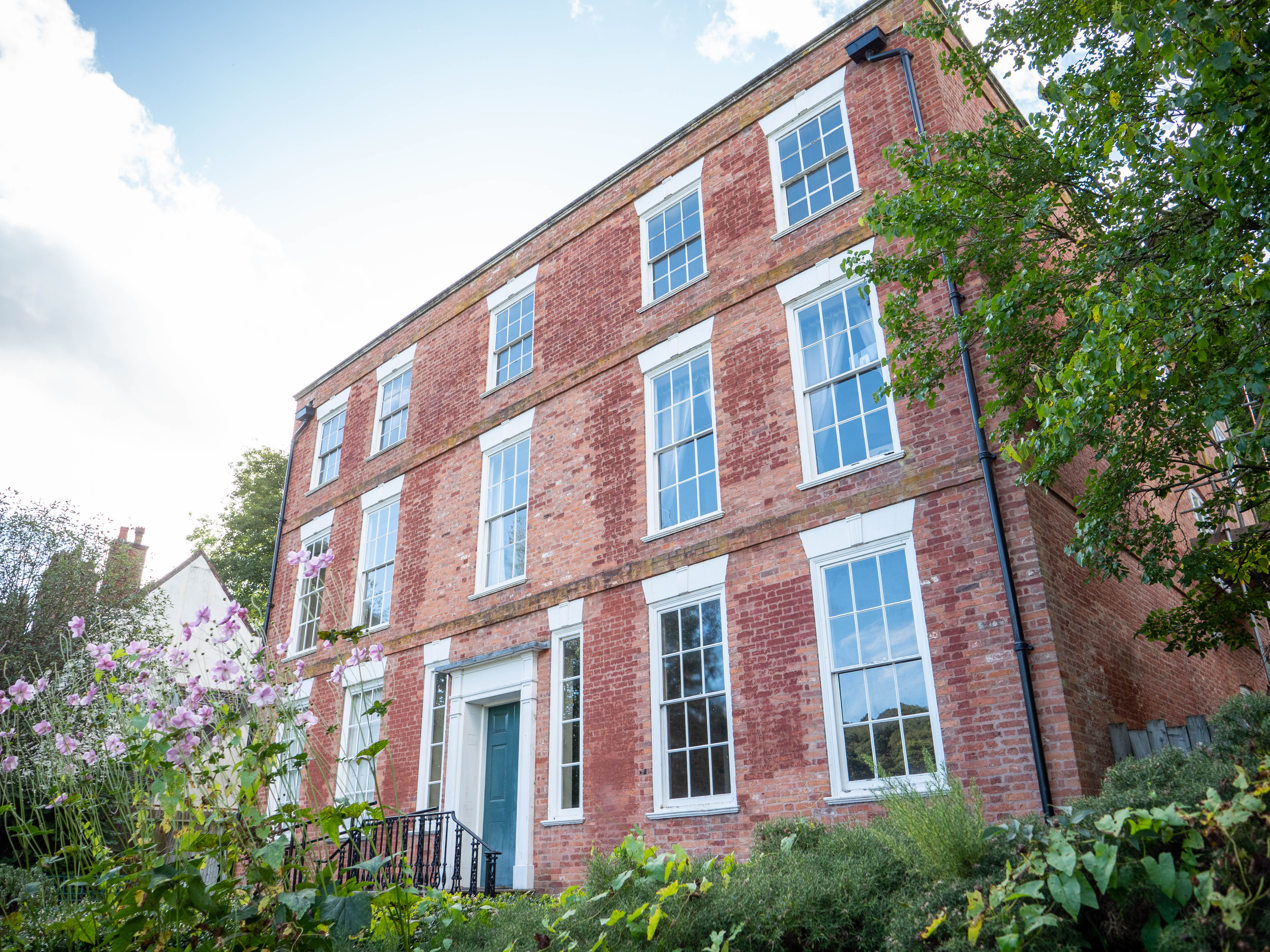
Dale House

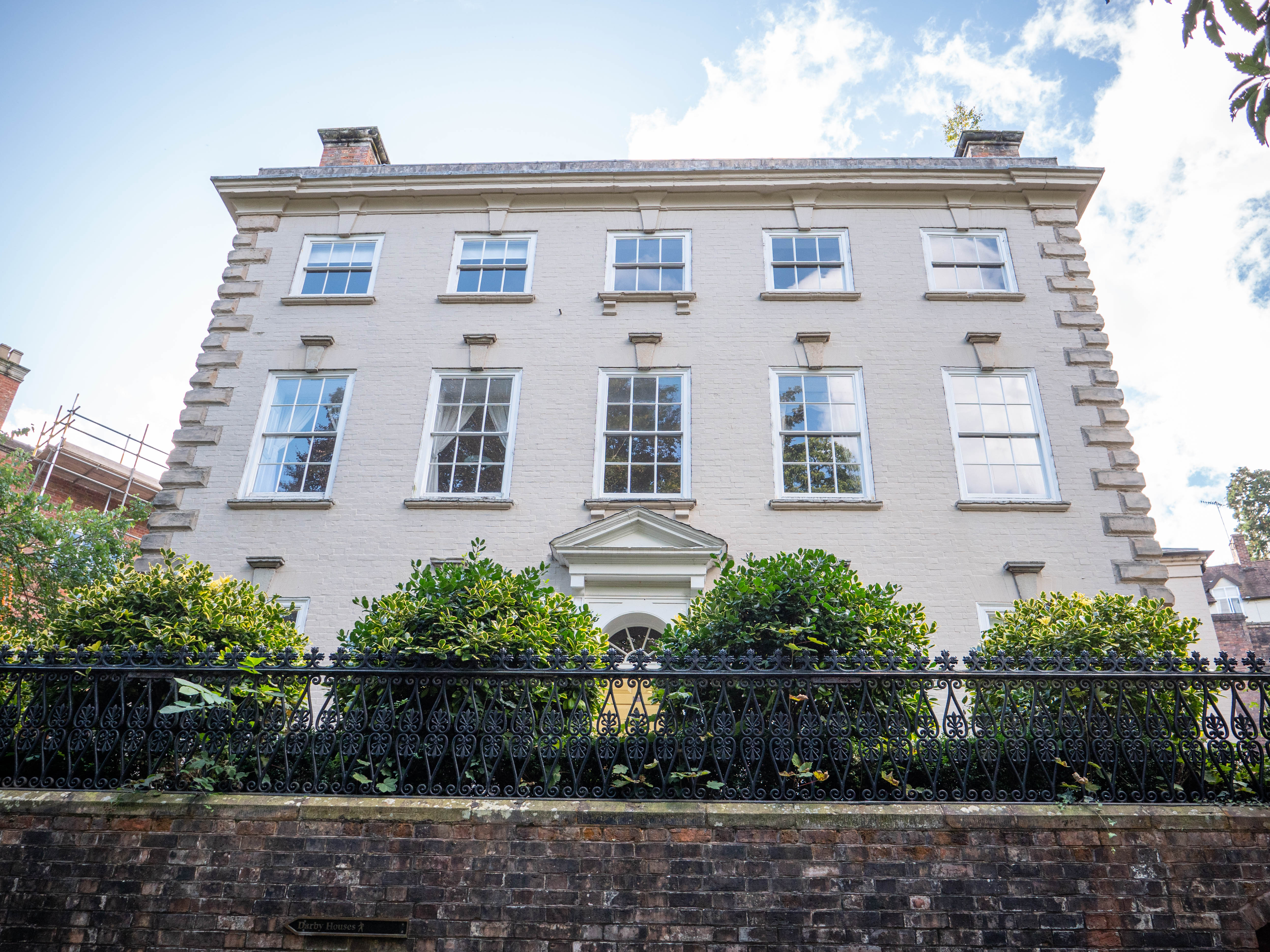
Rosehill House

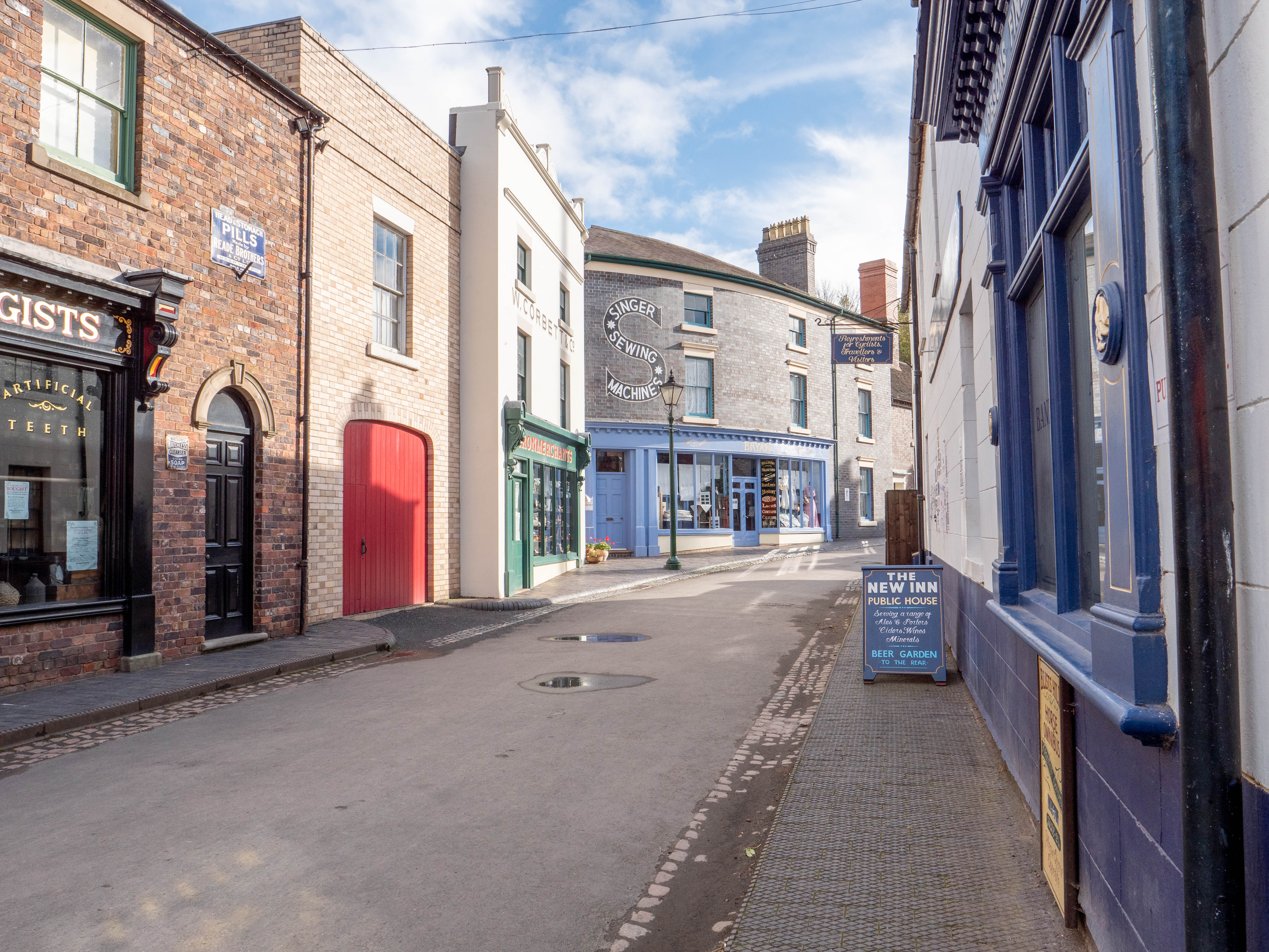
Blists Hill Victorian Town

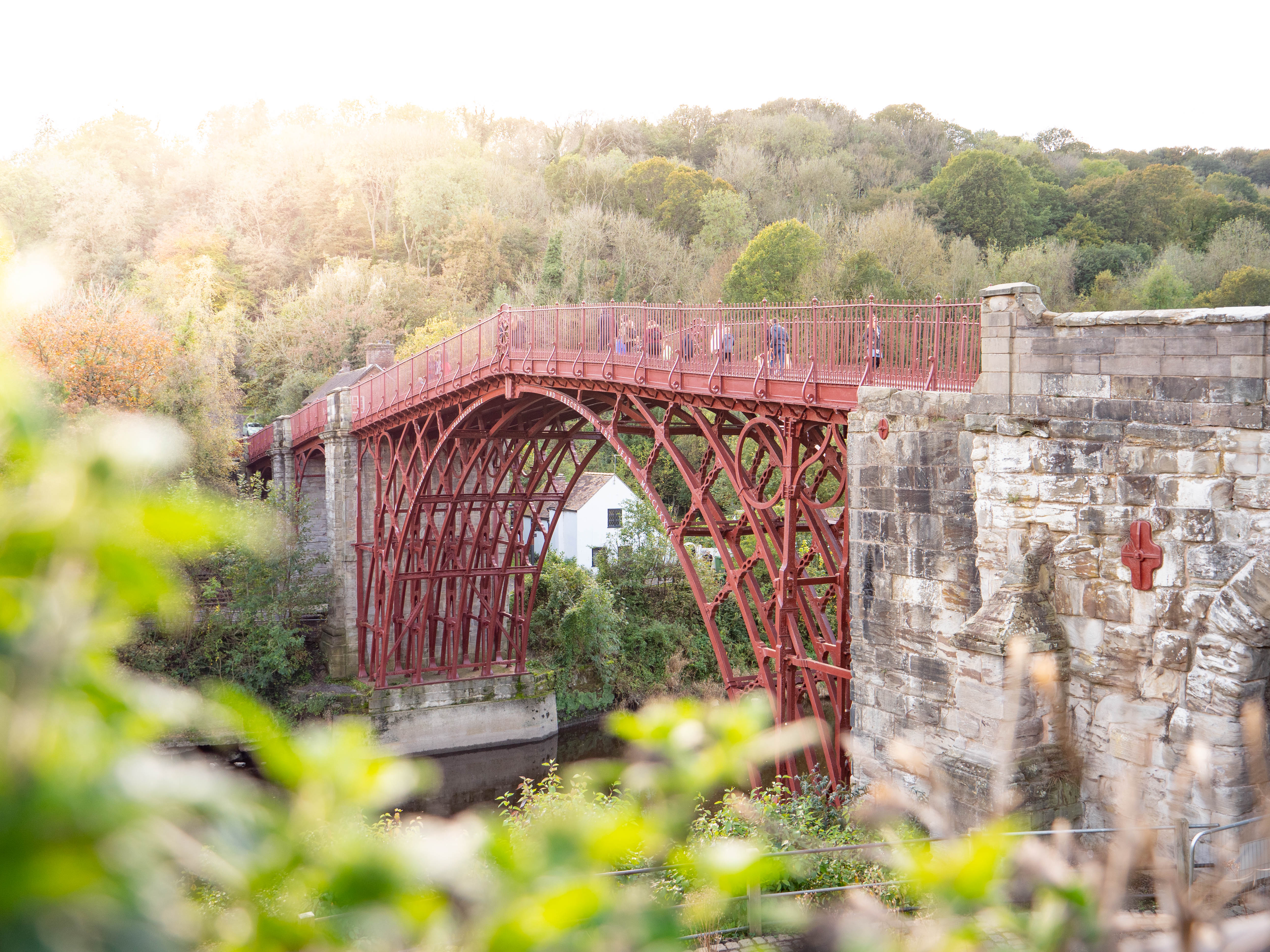
The Iron Bridge

== See also ==
- Ironbridge Gorge Museum Trust
- The Iron Bridge
- Ironbridge power stations
- Coalbrookdale by Night
- Listed buildings in The Gorge
