= John Brun (13/14th century MP) =

English politician

John Brun (fl. 1292–1302) was an English politician and cloth merchant. He sat as MP for Bridgnorth in 1298, alongside Roger Bonamy.

In 1292, he was reported for having sold cloth above the fixed price. From 1300 until 1302, he served as Provost of Bridgnorth.
