= Thomas de Isenham =

English politician

Thomas de Isenham (fl. 1298) was an English politician. He sat as MP for Bridgnorth in 1298, alongside Roger Bonamy.

He was probably the father of John de Isenham.
