= Ironbridge Institute =

The Ironbridge Institute is a centre offering postgraduate and professional development courses in cultural heritage, located in the Ironbridge Gorge region of Shropshire, England.

The institute is located in Coalbrookdale, just outside Ironbridge and near Telford.

It is a partnership between the University of Birmingham and the Ironbridge Gorge Museum Trust.

Ironbridge Gorge, on the River Severn, was an important industrial region during the Industrial Revolution in England.

== See also ==
- Industrial Revolution in England
- Ironbridge Gorge topics
