= Park Hall (disambiguation) =

Park Hall is a residential area in Walsall, England.

Park Hall may also refer to:

- Park Hall, Chesterfield, a grade-II listed building in Chesterfield, Derbyshire, England
- Park Hall, Oswestry, a football ground in Oswestry, Shropshire, England
- Park Hall, Shetland, a derelict listed building on the Mainland of Shetland, Scotland
- Park Hall, Washington County, Maryland, United States

== See also ==
- Park Hall Countryside Experience, a museum in Oswestry, Shropshire, England
