= George Guest (English organist) =

English organist

George Guest (1771-1831) was an English organist.

Guest was the son of Ralph Guest, who was born at Broseley in Shropshire, settled at Bury St. Edmunds in 1768, was organist of St. Mary's church there from 1805 to 1822, and he is said to have published some glees and songs. George Guest was born in 1771 at Bury St. Edmunds. He was chorister of the Chapels Royal, and may have been the "Master Guest" who was one of the principal singers (in Messiah and miscellaneous concerts) for the Hereford musical festival of 1783. Guest was organist at Eye, Suffolk, in 1787, and at St. Peter's, Wisbech, Cambridgeshire, from 1789 to 1831. He died at Wisbech on 11 September 1831, after a long and severe illness, aged 60.

He was the composer of four fugues and sixteen voluntaries for the organ; the cantatas, the 'Afflicted African' and the 'Dying Christian;' three quartets for flute and strings; three duets for two violoncellos; pieces for military bands; hymns, glees, and songs. It is probable that John Guest (fl. 1795), music master of Bury, and Jane Mary Guest (fl. 1780), afterwards Mrs. Miles, pianist, composer, and instructor of the Princess Charlotte of Wales, were relatives.
