= John de Isenham =

English politician

John de Isenham (fl. 1313) was an English politician. He sat as MP for Bridgnorth in 1313, alongside William Panning.

He was probably the son of Thomas de Isenham.
