= Coalbrookdale Museum of Iron =

Museum in Shropshire, England

Coordinates: 52.6392°N 2.4930°W

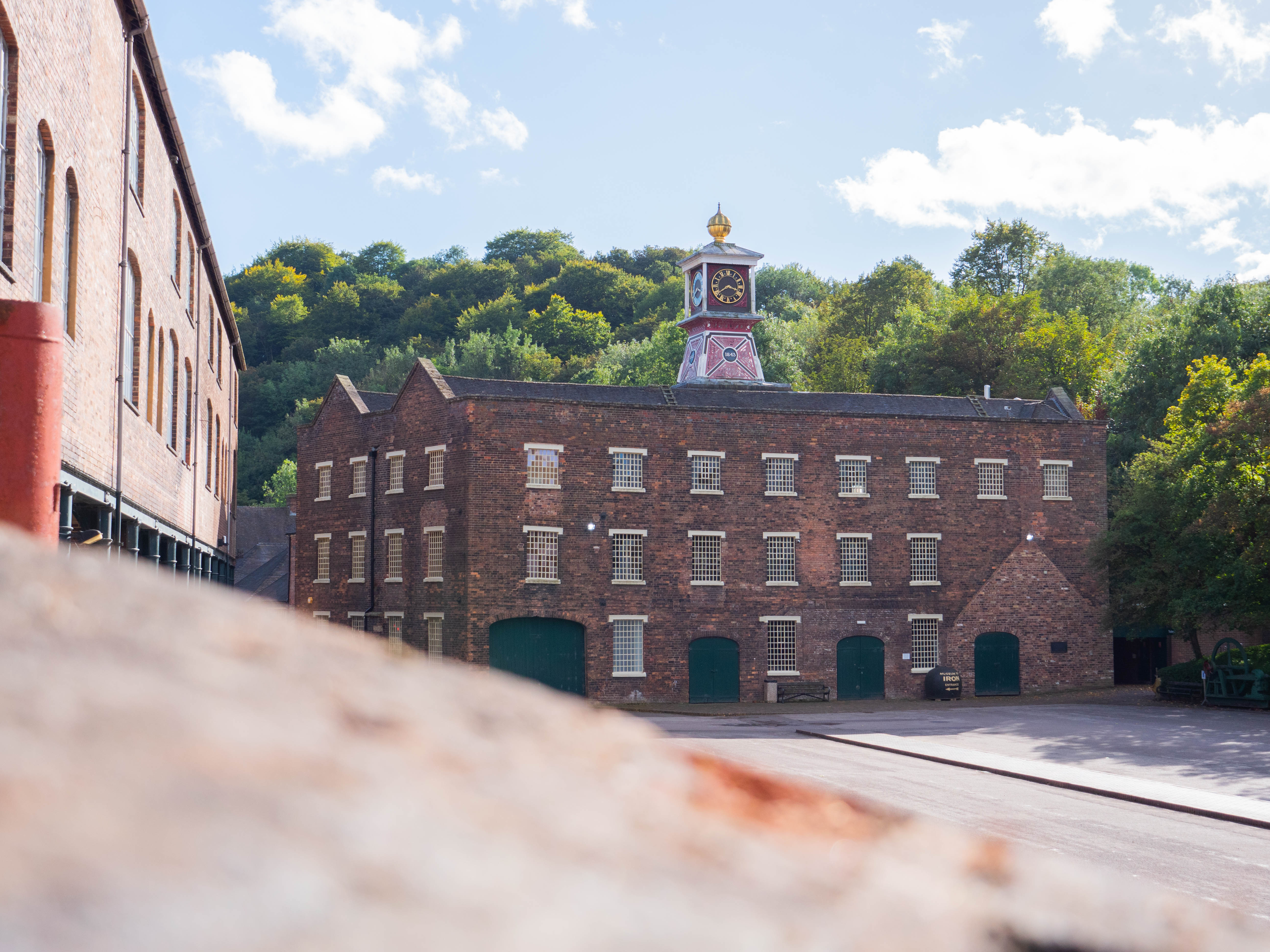
Coalbrookdale Museum of Iron

The Coalbrookdale Museum of Iron is managed by the National Trust and is one of ten museums acquired from the Ironbridge Gorge Museum Trust in 2026. The museum is based in the town of Coalbrookdale in the Ironbridge Gorge, in Shropshire, England, within a World Heritage Site, the birthplace of the Industrial Revolution.

== Museum ==
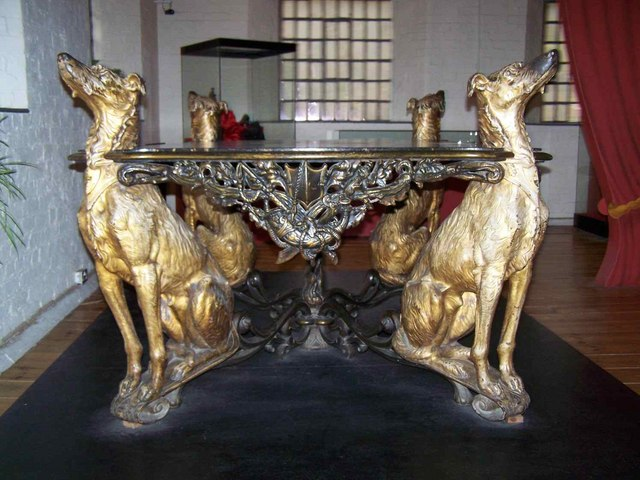
the Deerhound Table

The museum is open to the public Tuesday to Sunday and Bank Holiday Mondays.

On display are:

- the remains of the revolutionary water powered blast furnace known as the Old Furnace
- displays of domestic and decorative ironwork.
- the Boy and Swan Fountain cast by the Coalbrookdale Company for the Great Exhibition of 1851
- the Deerhound Table designed by sculptor John Bell for the Paris International Exhibition of 1855
- cast-iron Coalbrookdale Cooking Pots that introduced Abraham Darby I to the iron trade.

The Coalbrookdale site is also home to Enginuity, an interactive design and technology centre and Darby Houses are on a nearby road.

== The Old Furnace ==
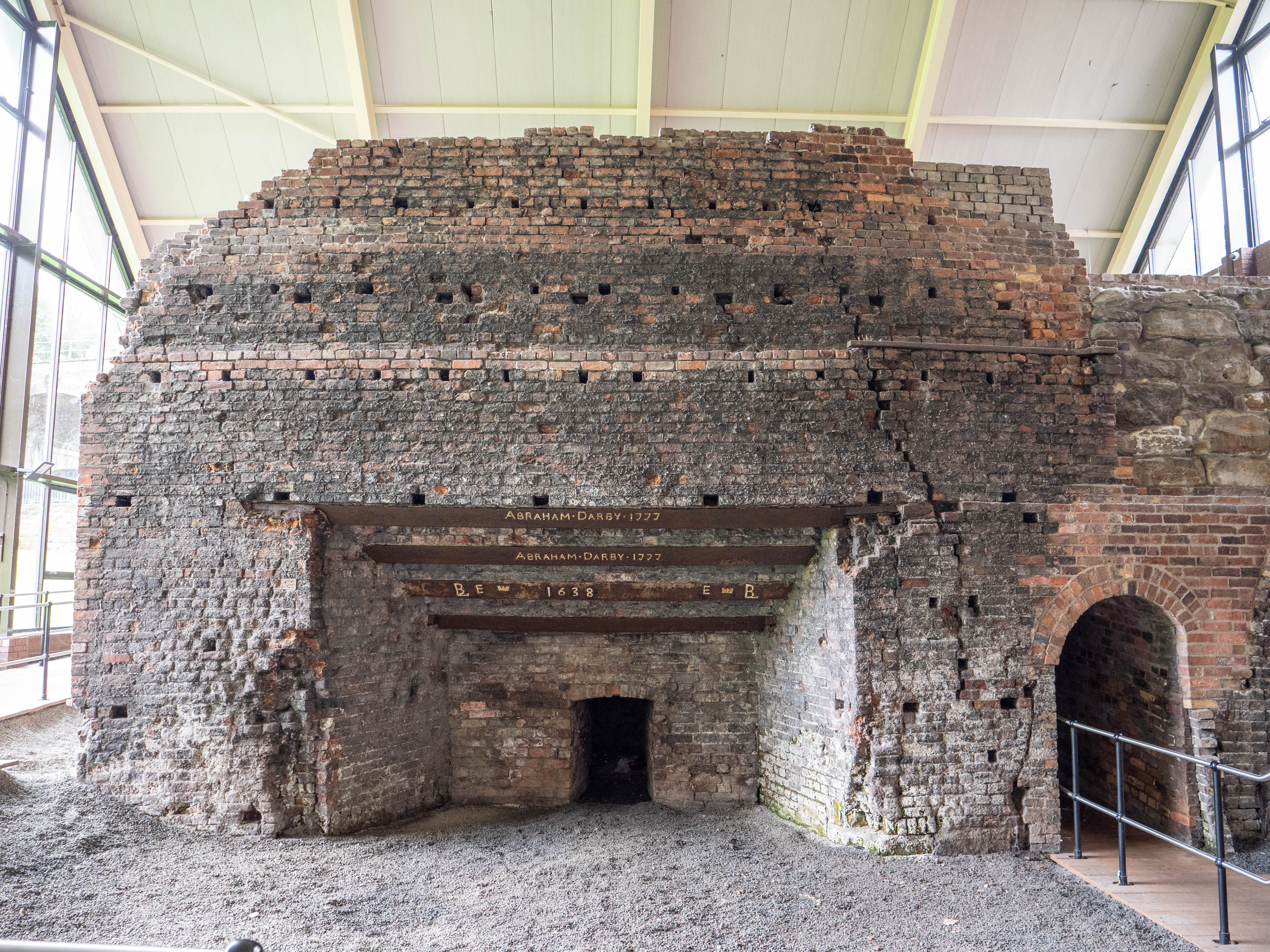
Abraham Darby's blast furnace

The Old Furnace is where Abraham Darby I perfected the smelting of iron with coke instead of charcoal.

In 1959 Allied Ironfounders, successors to the Coalbrookdale Company, had the Old Furnace site excavated to celebrate the 250th anniversary of Darby's first coke smelting. This led to a small Coalbrookdale Museum, which in 1970 became part of the Ironbridge Gorge Museum Trust as the Coalbrookdale Museum of Iron.

It is a Grade I listed structure. The Old Furnace was in 2014 the 100th recipient of the Engineering Heritage Award given by the Institution of Mechanical Engineers.
