= Howard Davis (field hockey) =

British field hockey player

Personal information
- Born: 24 September 1932 (age 94) Broseley, Shropshire, England
- Height: 178 cm (5 ft 10 in)
- Weight: 67 kg (148 lb)

Sport
- Sport: Field hockey
Senior career
Years	Team	Caps	Goals
1951–1968	North Stafford	-	-
National team
Years	Team	Caps	Goals
–	Great Britain		-
–	England		-

Francis Howard Vincent Davis (born 24 September 1932) is a British field hockey player. He competed at the 1956 Summer Olympics, the 1960 Summer Olympics and was captain at the 1964 Summer Olympics.

== Early life ==
Davis was born at Broseley, Shropshire, but moved to Stoke-on-Trent at age three. He was a boy chorister at Lichfield Cathedral, becoming head chorister at age fourteen. He completed his education at Felstead School. He served in the British Army for three years during the 1950s.

== Hockey career ==
Davis, who took up hockey after leaving school in 1947, played club hockey for North Stafford Hockey Club. He also played for the British Army of the Rhine (BAOR) hockey team during his military service.

Davis represented Great Britain at the 1956 Olympic Games in Melbourne.

A second Olympic appearance ensued for Great Britain at the 1960 Olympic Games in Rome and he was chosen as captain of 1964 Great Britain team for his third Olympics in Tokyo.

In 1967, he came out of retirement to captain England against Australia.
