= Ian Blakemore =

English cricketer

Ian Blakemore (born 13 May 1965 in Ironbridge, Shropshire) is an English cricketer. He was a left-handed batsman and left-arm slow bowler who played for Herefordshire.

Blakemore, who made his cricketing debut in 1983 for Glamorgan Under-25s, and who appeared occasionally for Glamorgan's Second XI, made a single List A appearance for Herefordshire during the 1997 season. He scored 7 runs and bowled two overs, taking bowling figures of 0–19.

His son, Curtis Blakemore, also plays cricket.
