= Broseley =

Market town in Shropshire, England

Coordinates: 52.612°N 2.481°W

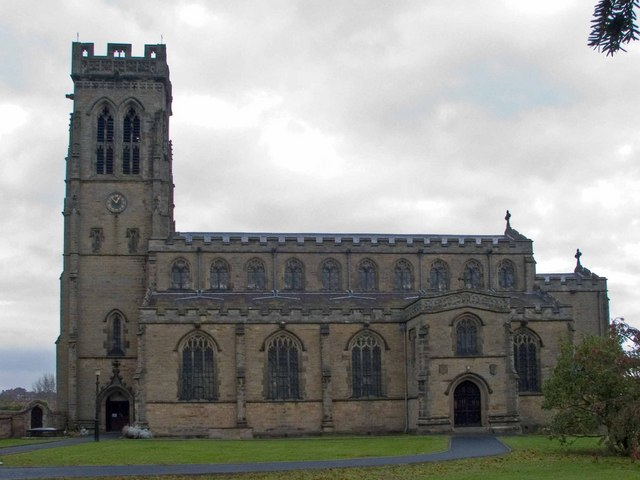
- All Saints' Parish Church

- Location within Shropshire
- Population: 4,929 (2011)
- OS grid reference: SJ676015
- Civil parish: Broseley
- Unitary authority: Shropshire
- Ceremonial county: Shropshire
- Region: West Midlands
- Country: England
- Sovereign state: United Kingdom
- Post town: BROSELEY
- Postcode district: TF12
- Dialling code: 01952
- Police: West Mercia
- Fire: Shropshire
- Ambulance: West Midlands
- UK Parliament: South Shropshire

Broseley (/broʊzliː/) is a market town in Shropshire, England, with a population of 4,929 at the 2011 Census and an estimate of 5,022 in 2019. The River Severn flows to its north and east. The first iron bridge in the world was built in 1779 across the Severn, linking Broseley with Coalbrookdale and Madeley. This contributed to the early industrial development in the Ironbridge Gorge, which is now part of a World Heritage Site.

== History ==
There was a settlement existing in 1086, listed as Bosle in the Domesday Book of that year, when it lay in the Hundred of Alnodestreu. That jurisdiction was dismembered in the time of King Henry I, when Broseley and Willey were reassigned to the Munslow Hundred. Finally they were transferred to the Liberty of Wenlock on its creation in the time of King Richard I. The place name appears as Burewardeslega in 1177, and in similar variants thereafter, indicating that it had anciently been Burgheard's (or Burgweard's) clearing, or grove. In Broseley's manorial history, the medieval family of de Burwardesley was considered by the historian R.W. Eyton to have been a cadet branch of the family of Fulk I FitzWarin of Whittington, Shropshire and Alveston, Gloucestershire.

The town lies on the south bank of the Ironbridge Gorge and so shares much of its history with its better known, more recent neighbour, Ironbridge.

In 1600, the town of Broseley consisted of only 27 houses and was part of the Shirlett Royal Forest. The area was known for mining; some of the stone used to build Buildwas Abbey was taken from Broseley and there is evidence that wooden wagonways existed there in 1605, giving Broseley a serious claim to the oldest railways in Britain. The wagonways were almost certainly constructed for the transport of coal and clay and it was these resources that led to the huge expansion of the town during the Industrial Revolution.

Many of the developments celebrated by the Ironbridge Gorge Museum Trust's collection of preserved industrial heritage sites either started in Broseley or were connected with it. Broseley was a centre for iron-making, pottery and clay pipes; the earliest recorded pipe-maker was working there in 1590. The Broseley Pipeworks is one of the trust's ten museums, another being the Jackfield Tile Museum in Jackfield, just north-east of the town.

John Wilkinson constructed the world's first iron boat whilst living in the town. The plans for the Iron Bridge were drawn up in Broseley. Abraham Darby I, who developed the process of smelting iron using coking coal, is buried there.

The area suffered economic decline in the latter half of the 19th century, as industries moved elsewhere. This left a legacy of uncapped mine shafts, derelict buildings, abandoned quarries, spoil heaps and pit mounds.

In the last thirty years of the 20th century Broseley underwent a modern revival, with the development of Telford across the River Severn. New estates were built to the east of Broseley centre, whilst many older properties were developed or renovated. However, the town still has fewer inhabitants than it did 200 years ago, when population figures were over 5,000.

Broseley & Ironbridge (in Cyan) shown in relation to Telford

== Environment ==
Broseley borders the Ironbridge Gorge World Heritage Site and evidence of involvement in the Industrial Revolution can be seen throughout the town, in the railways, mines, ironworks, brickworks, kilns, houses and fine buildings associated with the area's industrial past.

The jitties (lanes and paths) of Broseley Wood on the western boundary of Broseley are the remains of cottage settlements built for miners. At the other end of the social spectrum the town has many examples of Ironmaster houses, dating from the late 18th and early 19th centuries.

There are two wildlife areas maintained by local groups. The Hay Cop between Dark Lane and Ironbridge Road was the site of the town's water supply and was developed as a nature reserve in 2007. Penns Meadow on the border between Broseley and Benthall is a five-acre ancient meadow and is also being managed to protect and develop wildlife diversity. Both projects have been supported by the Broseley/Barrow Local Joint Committee, a Shropshire Council initiative to encourage devolution of decision-making to local people.

== Culture ==
Broseley's amateur dramatics society, BroADS, puts on several plays a year. Every month, the Birchmeadow Centre is used by Broseley Cinema, to show well-rated films on its own large screen. There is a thriving arts and crafts community that forms a group known as the Broseley Artists.

Since 2009, the Birchmeadow Centre, owned by the Town Council, has hosted live music events, presenting an array of UK and foreign artists, mainly in the folk, blues and ballad genres. They have included such figures as Bill Caddick, Phil Beer, Brooks Williams, Tom Hingley and Steve Knightley. Across the town's pubs and clubs, too, the live music scene is slowly expanding.

Since 2015 residents have held an annual music festival in the town's High Street, usually over the second weekend in June. It features local bands and is supported solely by fundraising events held throughout the year.

The town has a number of historic pubs and eating places, most of them near the town centre. It also has a "Broadplace" facility, a small centre for community usage of laptop computers, help and guidance and free Internet access. Broseley Library, which also has computer access, is located to the south of the town centre, next door to the health centre.

== Legacy ==
The type of bricks and tiles once produced in abundance in Broseley have become synonymous with any product of their type, regardless of where they were made. Broseley bricks are notable for their brown and red mottled nature, a sign of their cheap production, and Broseley tiles are of a strawberry red to light brown hue.

The pipeworks in Broseley were responsible for producing millions of clay pipes that were shipped worldwide. These are invaluable for dating archaeological sites, as they survive without decay and bear a maker's stamp that reveals their date of origin.

Works pioneered here and across the Ironbridge Gorge set the stage for mass production of iron products in the later Industrial Revolution that drove the expansion of the British Empire. This is due in part to the work of John Wilkinson and his construction of precision-engineered steam engines and weaponry.

== Local government ==
Broseley is a civil parish with the status of a town and as such has a town council chaired by a town mayor. It is in the part of Shropshire administered by Shropshire, a unitary authority; prior to 2009 it formed part of the district of Bridgnorth.

== Education ==
There are two primary schools: Broseley Church of England or Dark Lane School and John Wilkinson School, named after the noted ironmaster who lived nearby. For secondary education, most pupils travel to William Brookes School in Much Wenlock or to Abraham Darby Academy in Madeley and elsewhere.

== Media ==
Local news and television programmes are provided by BBC West Midlands and ITV Central. Television signals are received from the nearby Wrekin TV transmitter. Local radio stations are BBC Radio Shropshire, Hits Radio Black Country & Shropshire, Capital North West & Wales and Greatest Hits Radio Midlands. The Shropshire Star is the town's local weekly newspaper.

== Notable people ==
In birth order:

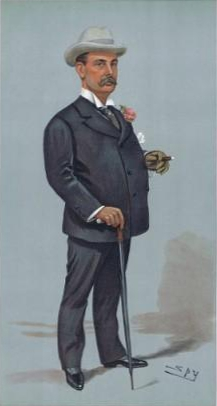
Thomas Salter Pyne, in Vanity Fair, 1900

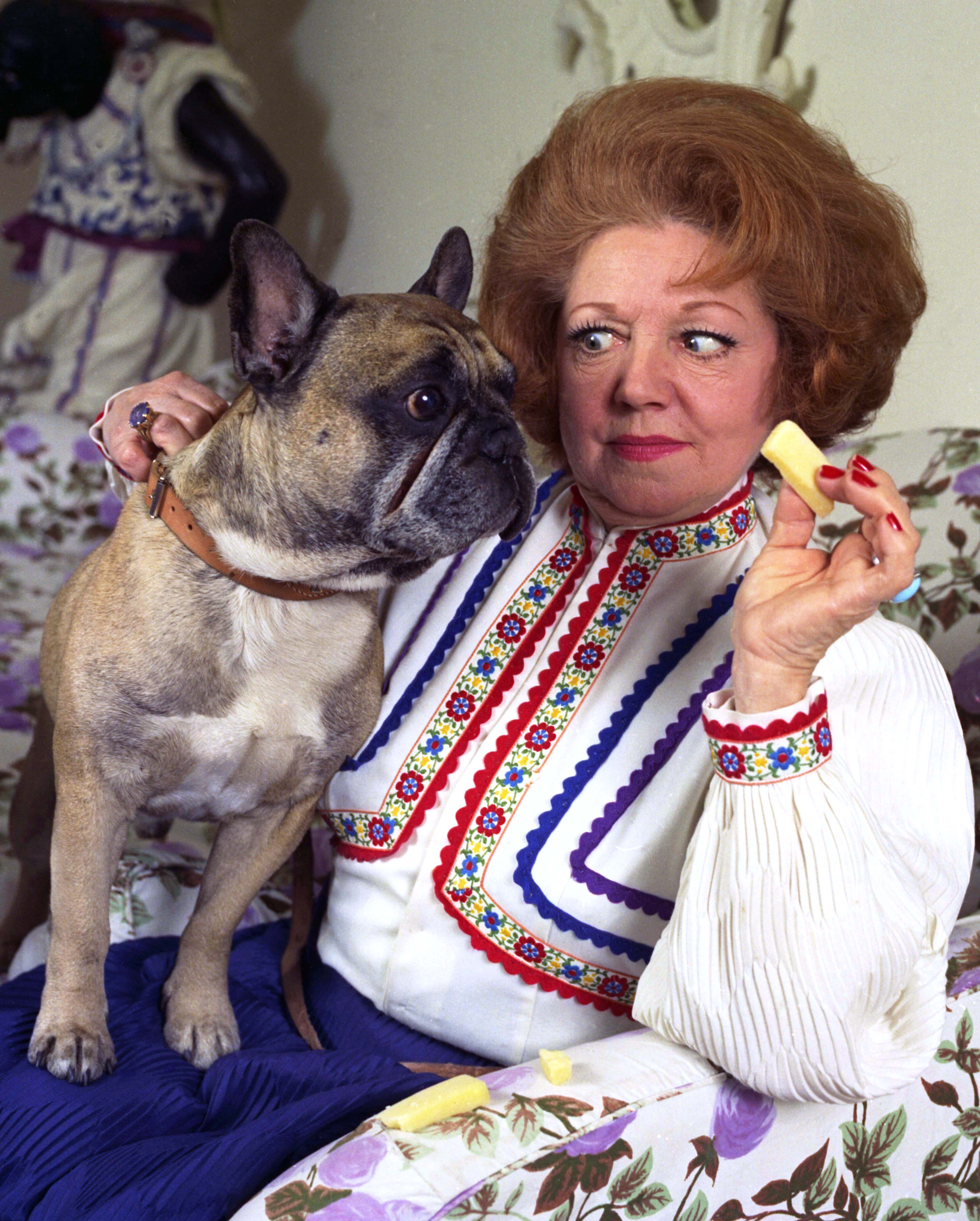
Hermione Baddeley, 1970s

- Thomas Rutter, (1654 or 1660-1730), Iron Master, Pennsylvania, USA
- Abraham Darby I (1678–1717), industrialist and innovator, was buried here.
- John Guest (1722–1785 or 1787) was a brewer, farmer and coal merchant here.
- Peter Onions (1724–1798), ironmaster, invented a puddling process to refine wrought iron, was born here.
- John Wilkinson (1728–1808) lived here and devised a method of boring cannon of increased accuracy.
- Jabez Carter Hornblower (1744–1814), pioneer of steam power, was born here.
- William Reynolds (1758–1803), ironmaster and scientist, died in Broseley.
- George Guest (1771-1831), an English organist.
- John Russell (1788–1873), industrialist and colliery owner in the South Wales Valleys, was born here.
- George Pearce Baldwin (1789–1840), iron founder at Stourport-on-Severn and grandfather of Stanley Baldwin (1867–1947), prime minister, was born here.
- John Pritchard (1797–1891), lawyer, banker and Conservative MP for Bridgnorth, was born here.
- Charles Henry Hartshorne (1802–1865) an English cleric and antiquary, was born here.
- Favell Lee Mortimer (1802–1878), religious and educational writer, lived at Broseley Hall before settling with her husband in Norfolk.
- Osborne Gordon (1813–1883), clergyman, Christ Church, Oxford college tutor, was born here.
- Orlando Weld-Forester, 4th Baron Forester (1813-1894), Church of England clergyman, was Rector there 1841-1859 before succeeding to his peerage.
- Cecil Weld-Forester, 5th Baron Forester (1842-1917), Conservative MP for Wenlock, was born and grew up during the time of his father's parish incumbency.
- Rowland Hunt (1858–1943), Conservative MP for Ludlow, died at Lindley Green, Broseley.
- Sir Thomas Salter Pyne (1860–1921), an engineer based in Afghanistan, was born here.
- William Whitehead Watts (1860–1947), geologist, was born here.
- Hermione Baddeley (1906–1986), film and stage actress, was born here.
- Shane Embury (born 1967), bass player in the grindcore band Napalm Death, was born here.

=== Sports ===
- Howard Davis (born 1932), field hockey player, competed at the 1956 and 1960 Summer Olympics, and was captain at the 1964 Summer Olympics
- Leroy Watson (born 1966), archer, won the 1988 Summer Olympics team bronze medallist, was born here.
- Sam Aiston (born 1976), former footballer, played 416 games, mainly for Shrewsbury Town F.C., head teacher at Broseley Church of England School in 2022.
- Ben Simons (born 1986), competed in the 2014 Winter Olympics bobsleigh, was born here.

== Namesake ==
The town's name passed to Broseley, Missouri, US, founded in 1915 by William N. Barron and named in honour of his English wife's home town.

== See also ==
- Listed buildings in Broseley
