= William Panning =

14th-century English politician

William Panning was an English politician. He sat as MP for Bridgnorth in 1313, alongside John de Isenham.
