= Coalport China Museum =

Industry museum in Coalport, England

Coordinates: 52°37′8″N 2°27′4″W

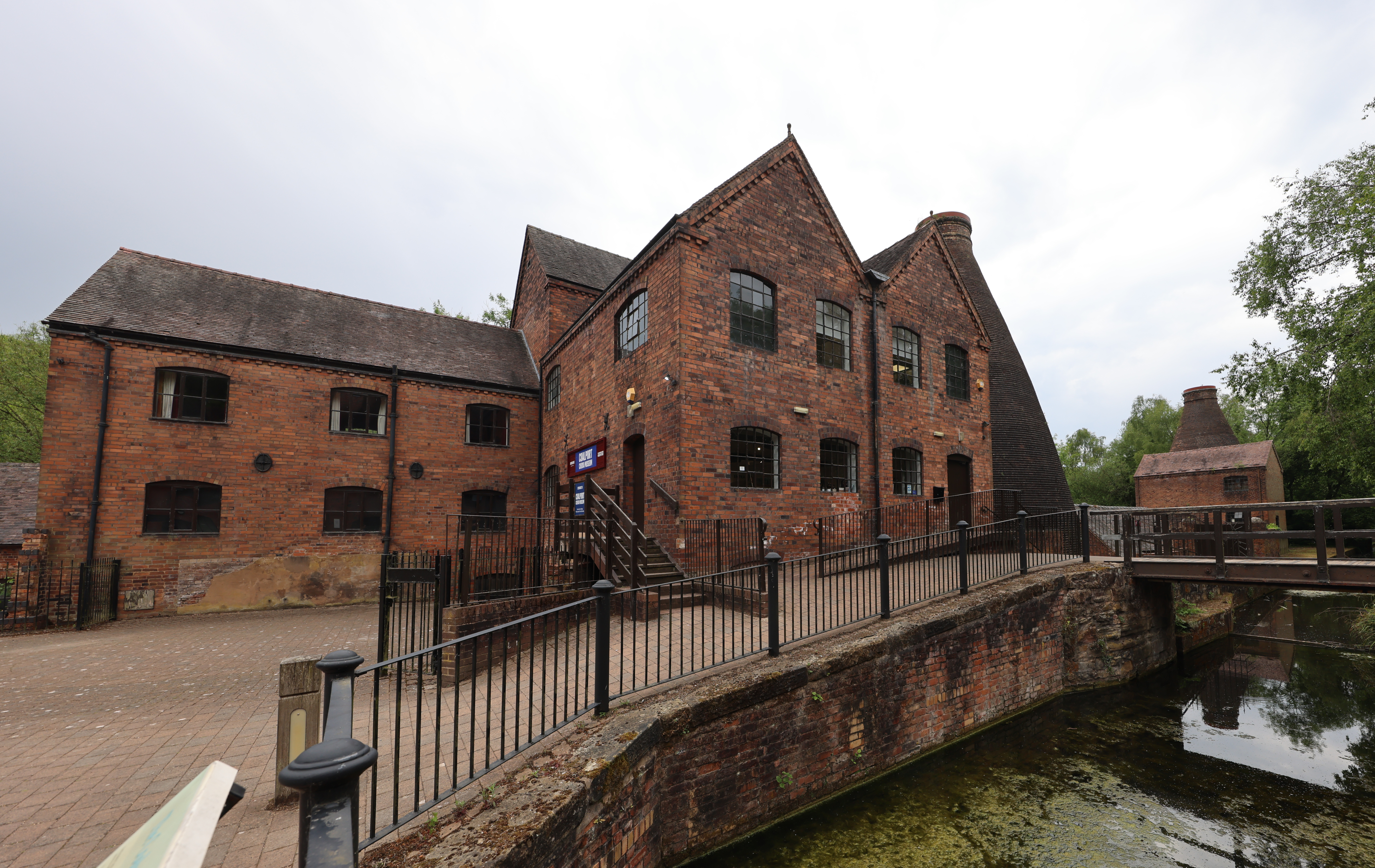
Coalport China Museum

The Coalport China Museum is managed by the National Trust and is one of the ten museums to be acquired from the Ironbridge Gorge Museum Trust in 2026. The museum is based in the village of Coalport within the Ironbridge Gorge on the northern bank of the River Severn in Shropshire, United Kingdom.

== History ==
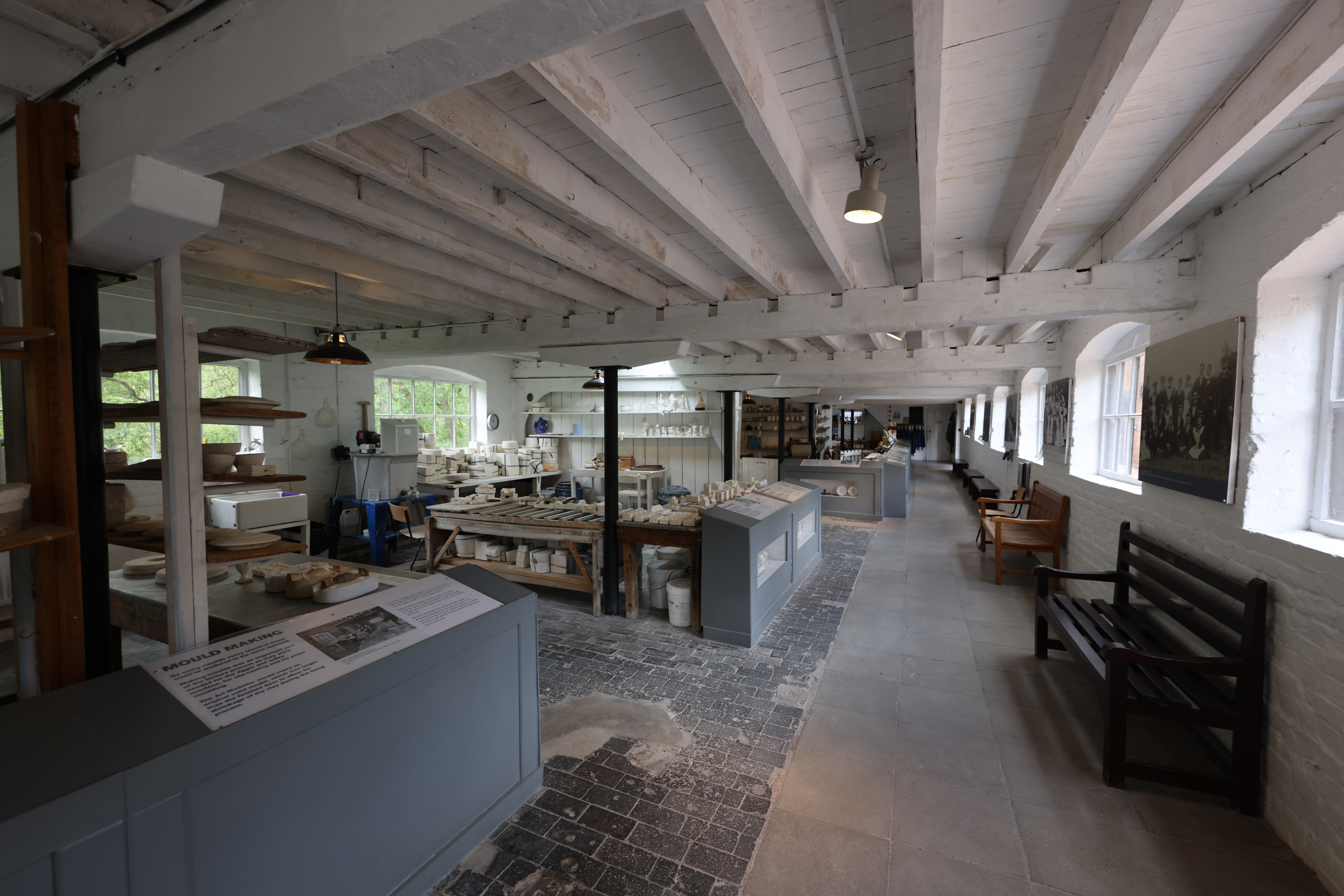
The Long workshop at the Coalport China Museum

The museum presents the history of Coalport China, a manufacturer of fine British chinaware which was based on the site between 1796 and 1926. The China Works was established on the site in 1796 by John Rose, becoming a centre for fine china throughout the 19th century. After the closure of the factory, operations were moved to Stoke-on-Trent. The site was bought by the Ironbridge Gorge Museum Trust half a century after its closure, opening to the public in 1976.

It is located in a World Heritage Site, considered to be the birthplace of the Industrial Revolution due to the rapid development of industry and technology in the region. It was designated as a World Heritage Site in 1986.

== Collections ==
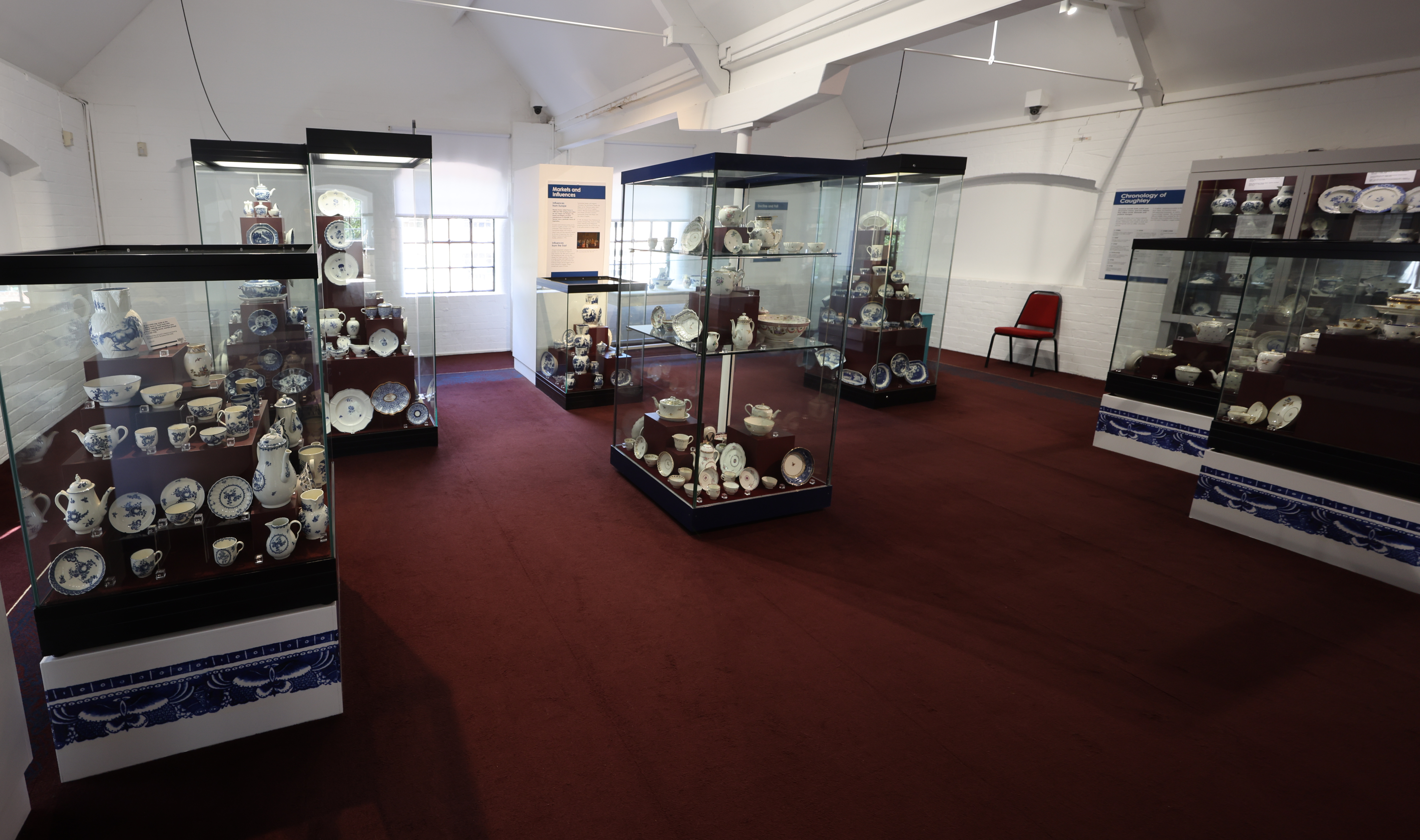
Gallery with the Caughley china collection

As well as original examples of historic china, there are also demonstrations of traditional ceramic techniques and original industrial buildings including kilns to fire the pottery. The collections include the official National Collections of Caughley and Coalport china. There is a hands-on workshop area where painting activities are provided as well as ceramic activities in the school holidays.

== In the media ==
The 1985 Doctor Who serial The Mark of the Rani used the museum as a filming location.

== See also ==
- Listed buildings in The Gorge
