= Ironbridge Gorge Museum Trust =

Museum service in Shropshire, England

Coordinates: 52.639°N 2.493°W

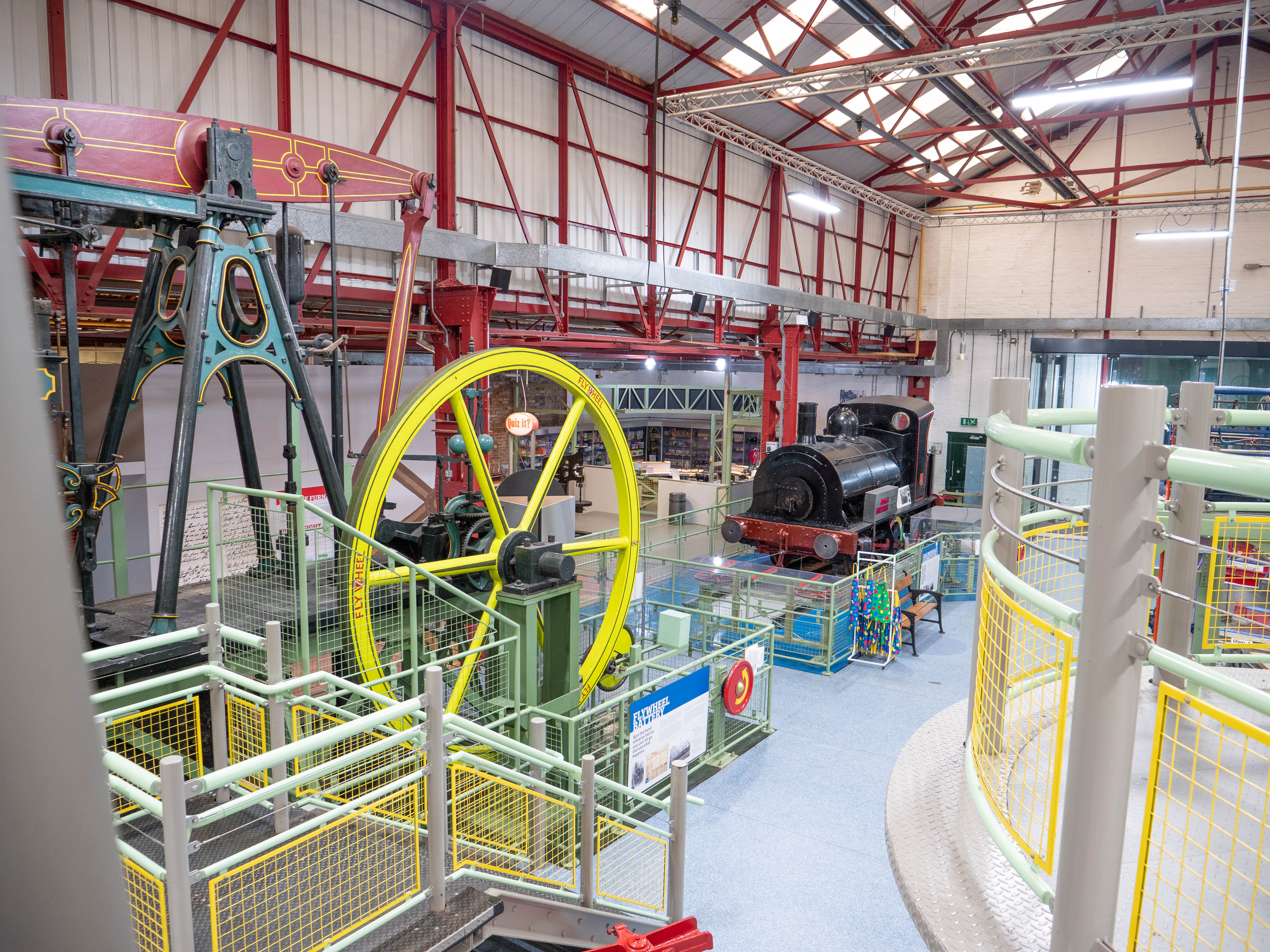
Enginuity Museum

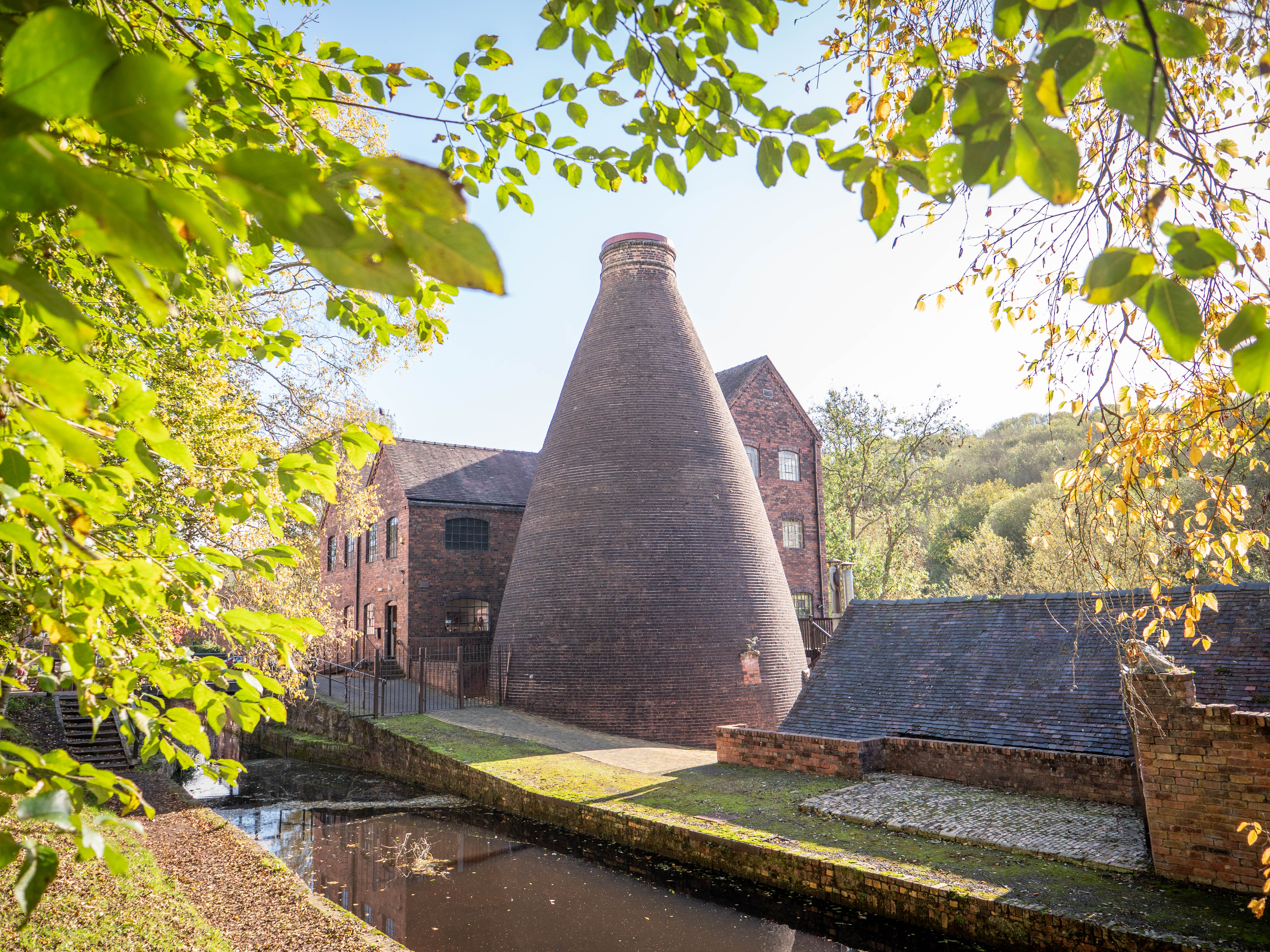
One of the large kilns at Coalport China Museum

The Ironbridge Gorge Museum Trust was an industrial heritage organisation which ran ten museums and managed multiple historic sites within the Ironbridge Gorge World Heritage Site in Shropshire, England, widely considered as the birthplace of the Industrial Revolution. Its assets are now managed by the National Trust. The Gorge includes a number of settlements important to industrial history and with heritage assets, including Ironbridge, Coalport and Jackfield along the River Severn, and also Coalbrookdale and Broseley. The area was among the first sites in the United Kingdom to be declared a World Heritage Site by UNESCO in 1986.

== History ==
The Ironbridge Gorge Museum Trust was established in 1968 to preserve and interpret the birthplace of the Industrial Revolution in the Ironbridge Gorge. It was an independent educational charity. From 1970 it absorbed the Coalbrookdale Museum, now the Coalbrookdale Museum of Iron, which had been established in 1959.

The museum staff managed 35 historic sites within the Ironbridge Gorge World Heritage Site, including ten museums. The sites also included archaeological sites, two chapels, housing, two Quaker burial grounds, a research library, a tourist information centre, woodland, and two youth hostels.

In 1977, the Ironbridge Gorge Museum was awarded National Heritage Museum of the Year.

In 2025 plans were put in place for the National Trust to take over the various museums on 2 March 2026. A total cost for the transfer has not been announced but is aided by a £9 million grant from the Department for Culture Media and Sport.

In March 2026, the museums were temporarily closed following the handover for rebranding and upgrading of IT systems with the National Trust implementing a phased reopening over the year starting with the Museum of Iron on 20 May.

== Museums ==
The ten museum sites that were run by the Trust, collectively known as The Ironbridge Gorge Museums were:

1. Blists Hill Victorian Town, including the Hay Inclined Plane
2. Broseley Pipeworks
3. Coalbrookdale Museum of Iron
4. Coalport China Museum
5. Tar Tunnel
6. Darby Houses
7. Enginuity
8. Iron Bridge and Tollhouse
9. Jackfield Tile Museum
10. Museum of the Gorge

== Ironbridge International Institute for Cultural Heritage ==
The Ironbridge International Institute for Cultural Heritage, formerly the Ironbridge Institute, was a centre for cross-disciplinary research, postgraduate teaching and policy engagement based at the University of Birmingham.
