= Broseley Pipeworks =

Industrial museum in Broseley, England

Coordinates: 52.61685°N 2.48657°W

- Type: Private
- Industry: Pipe smoking
- Headquarters: England
- Products: Tobacciana

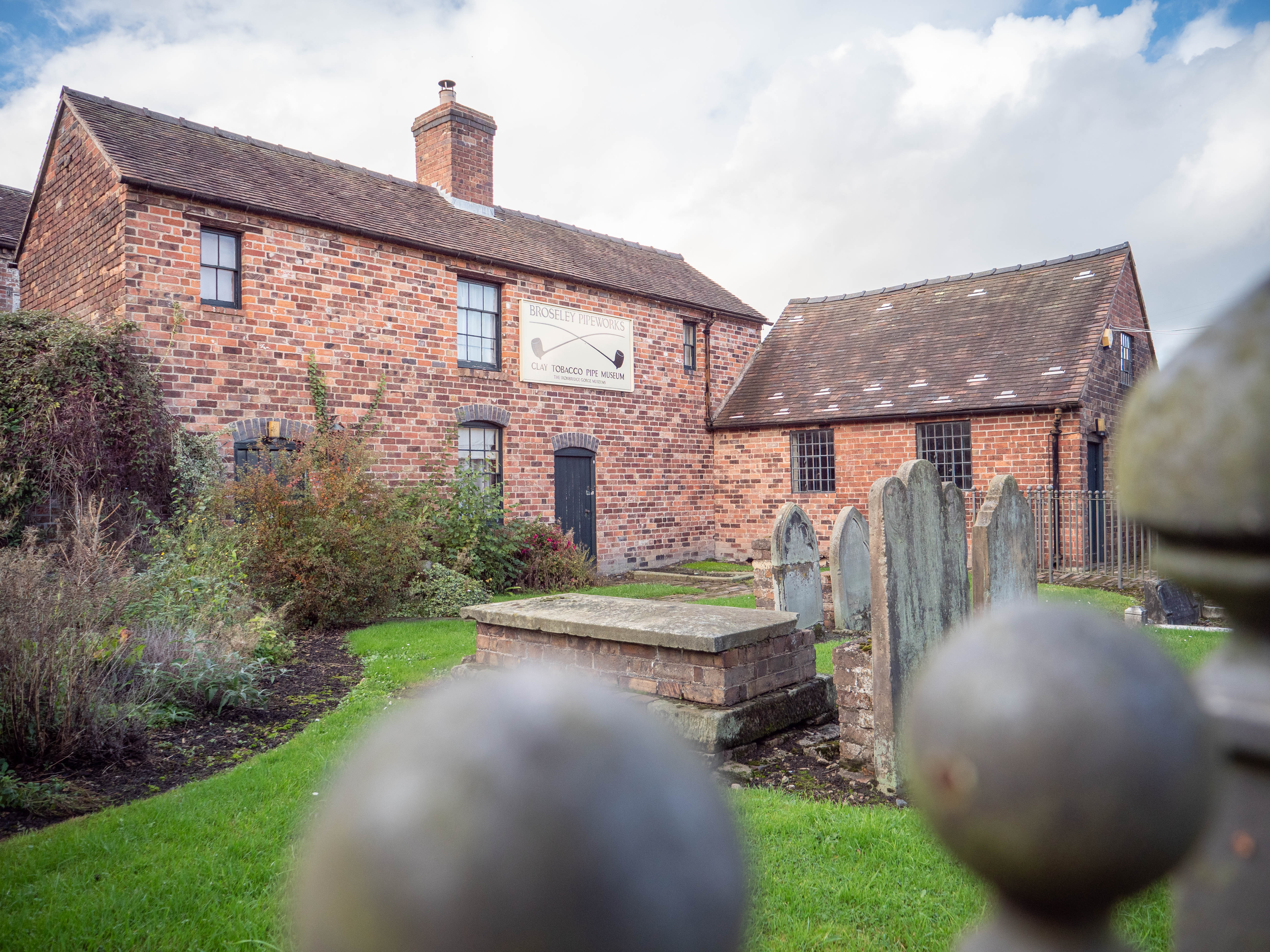
Broseley Pipeworks

The Broseley Pipeworks is one of ten Ironbridge Gorge Museums which were administered by the Ironbridge Gorge Museum Trust until 2026, when they were transferred to the care of the National Trust.

The museum is based in the market town of Broseley in the Ironbridge Gorge, in Shropshire, England within a World Heritage Site, acclaimed as the birthplace of the Industrial Revolution. Clay pipes were recorded being made at Broseley as early as 1590.

Once the site of the most prolific clay tobacco pipe makers in Britain, the Southorn family, and exporting worldwide, the works were abandoned in the 1950s and some areas are shown to the public as they looked on the day the factory closed.

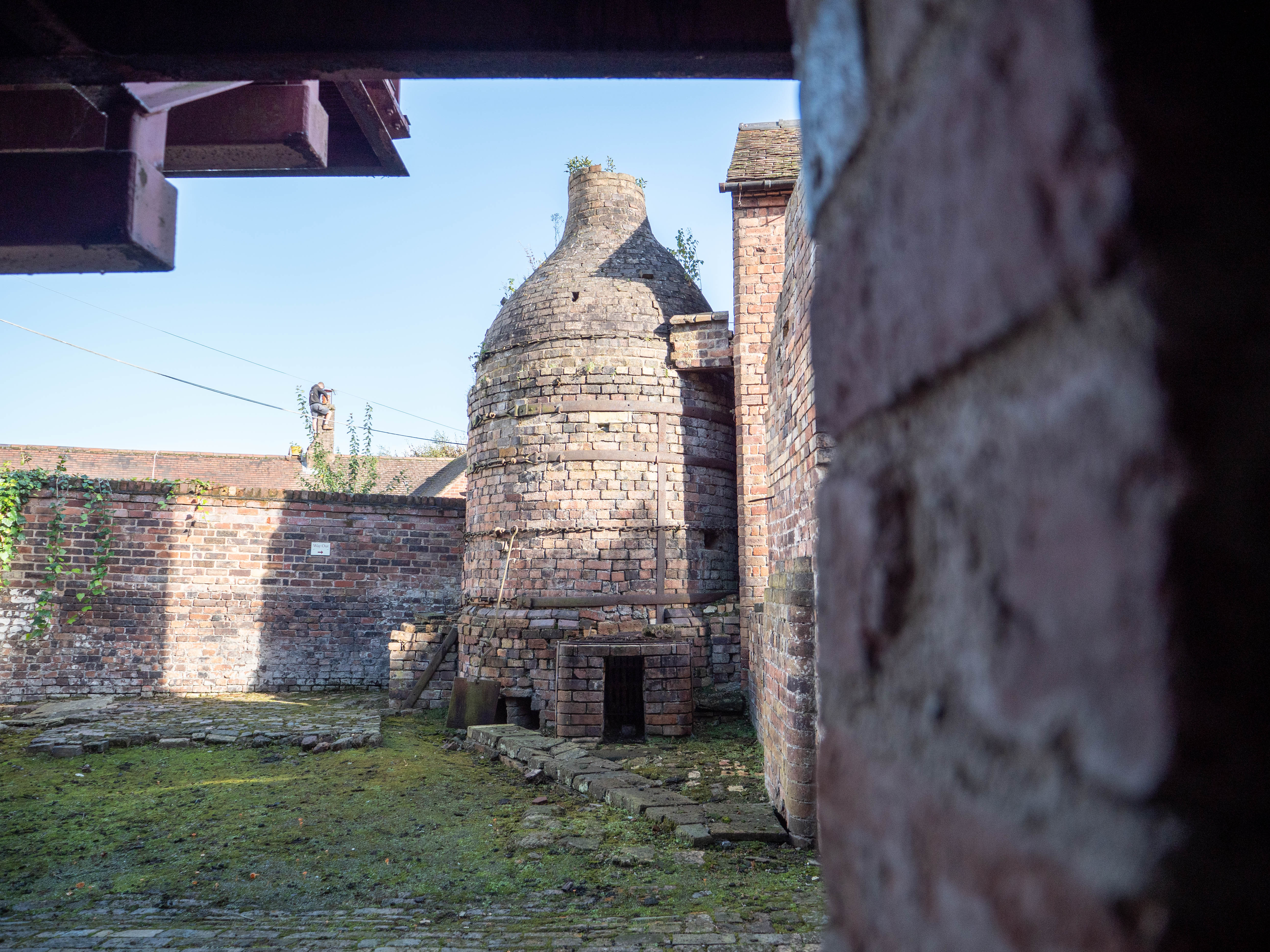
Pipeworks bottle kiln

The museum preserves the details of the industry of clay tobacco pipe making and has a display of clay tobacco pipes, including the Churchwarden and Dutch Long Straw pipes. A clay pipe maker can sometimes be seen demonstrating the process of making clay pipes by hand. There are also displays of historic prints relating to the production of tobacco and the art of smoking, as well as other items relating to tobacco.

The pipeworks are Grade II listed.
