= Roger Bonamy =

English politician in 1298

Roger Bonamy (fl. 1298–1302) was an English politician. He sat as MP for Bridgnorth in 1298.

He was probably the son of William Bonamy, who was on more than one occasion Provost of the Borough. Roger also served as Provost from 1300 till 1302.
