= Enginuity =

Interactive museum in Shropshire, England

Coordinates: 52.628°N 2.485°W

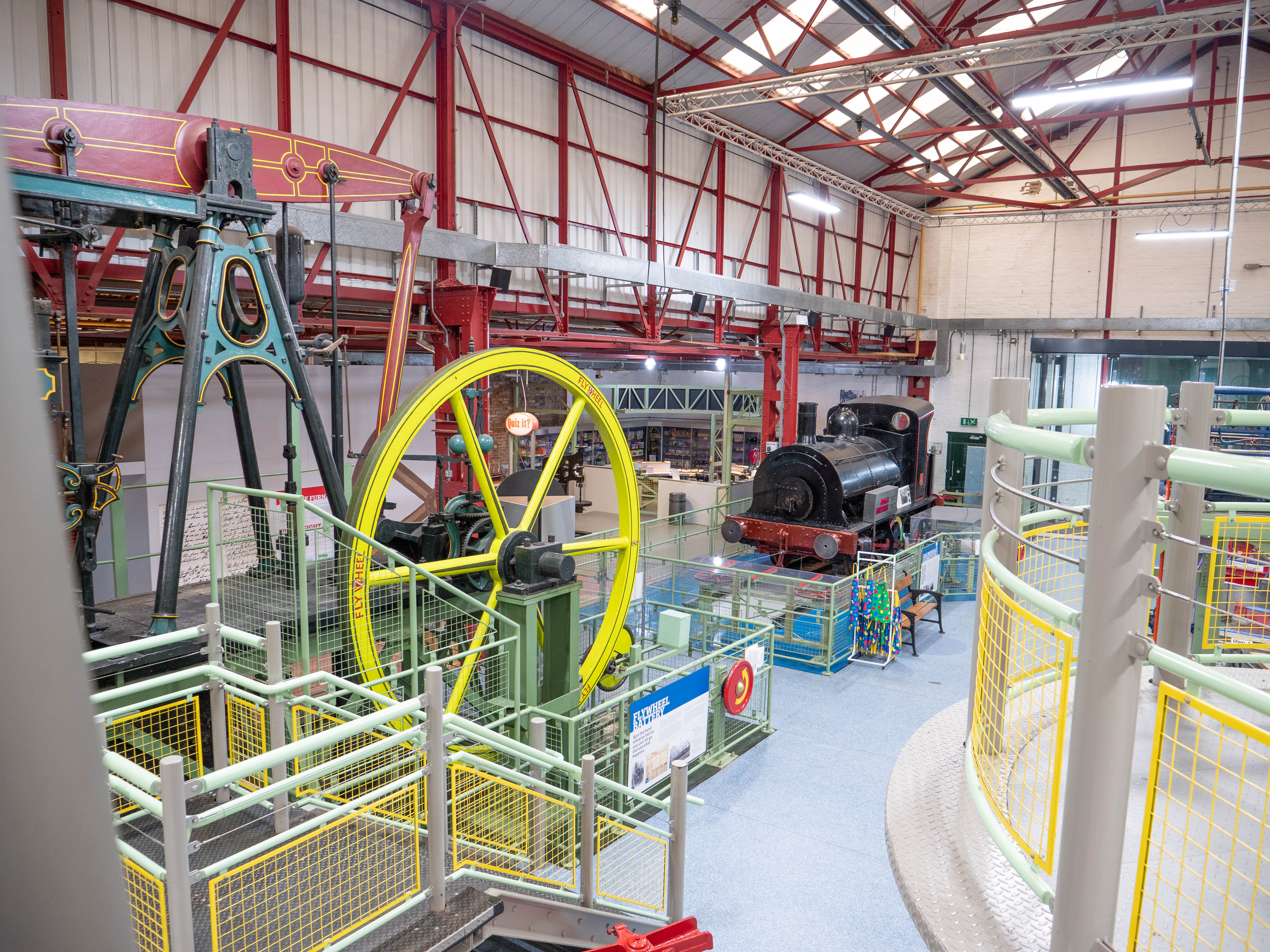
The main hall at Enginuity

Enginuity is an interactive design and technology centre in Coalbrookdale, Shropshire, England. It was opened in 2002 making it the last new museum to be operated by the Ironbridge Gorge Museum Trust before its transfer to its present owner, the National Trust, in 2026. The museum's exhibition floor is divided into four zones: Materials & Structures, Systems & Control, Energy and Design. Enginuity also offers workshops and interactive shows for school groups. During school holidays, the interactive shows are offered to the general public on varying themes.

== Zones ==
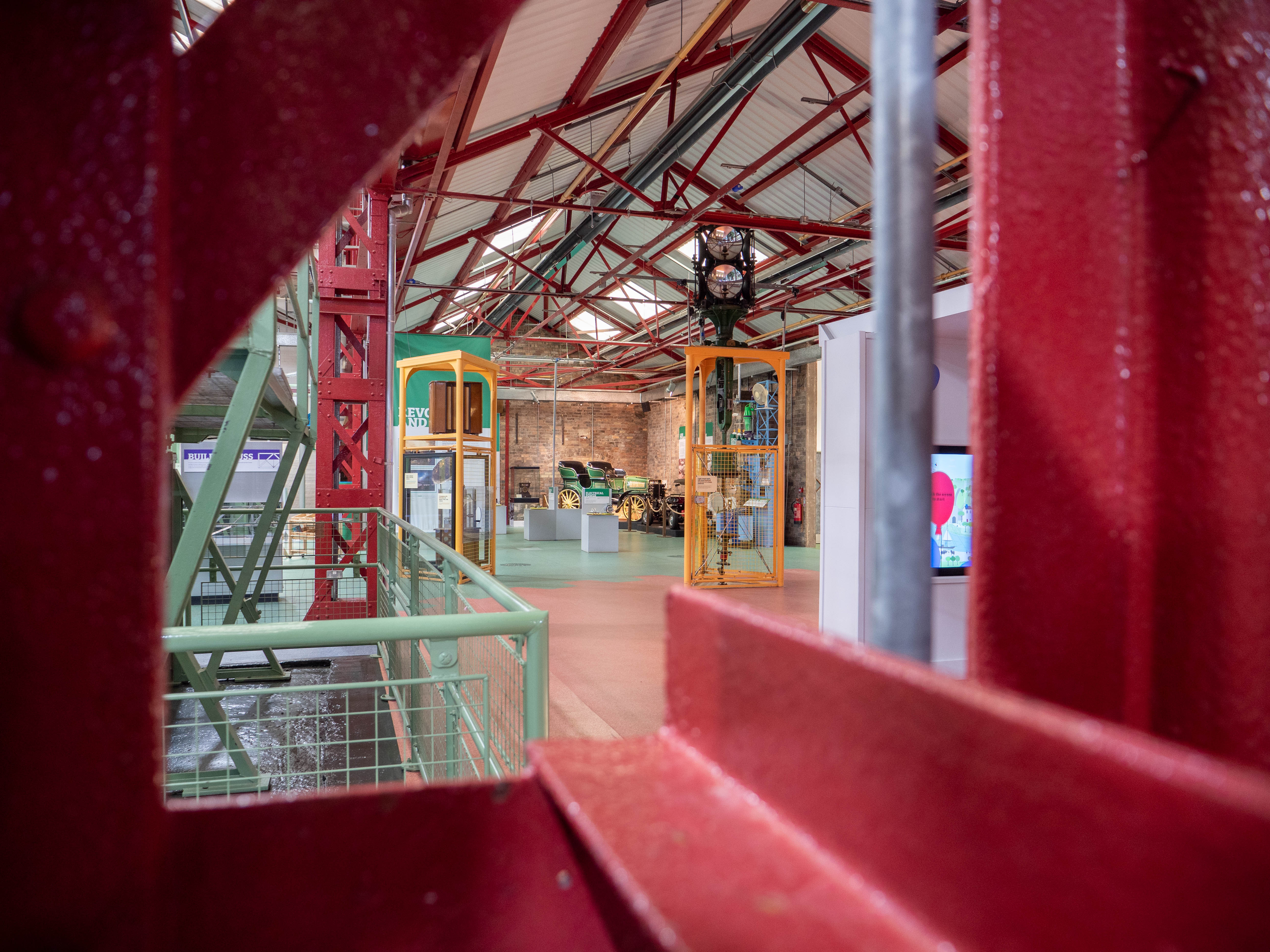
The ground floor at Enginuity, where Parker's Steam Car is on display.

- Materials & Structures
- Systems & Control
- Energy
- Design
- FABLAB

== Workshops ==
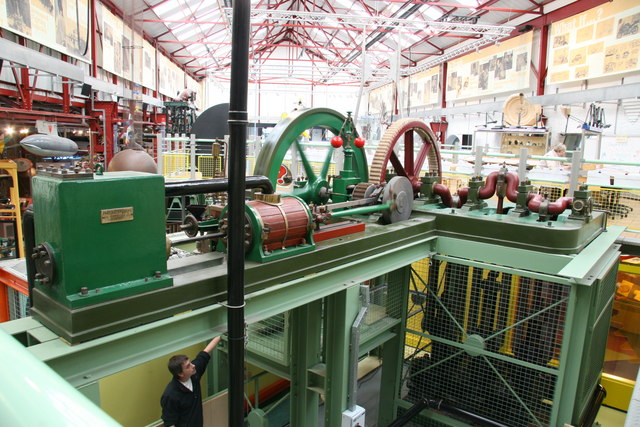

Workshops can be run for school groups or even as corporate events. The currently available workshops are:

- Downhill buggies
- Powered buggies
- Pneumatic cranes
- Pewter casting
- Bridges
- Cantilevers
- parachuting
- Table Tennis Triathlon

== Shows ==
- Materials
- Forces
- Electricity
