= Lightmoor =

Village in Shropshire, England

Coordinates: 52.650199°N 2.481184°W

- Village
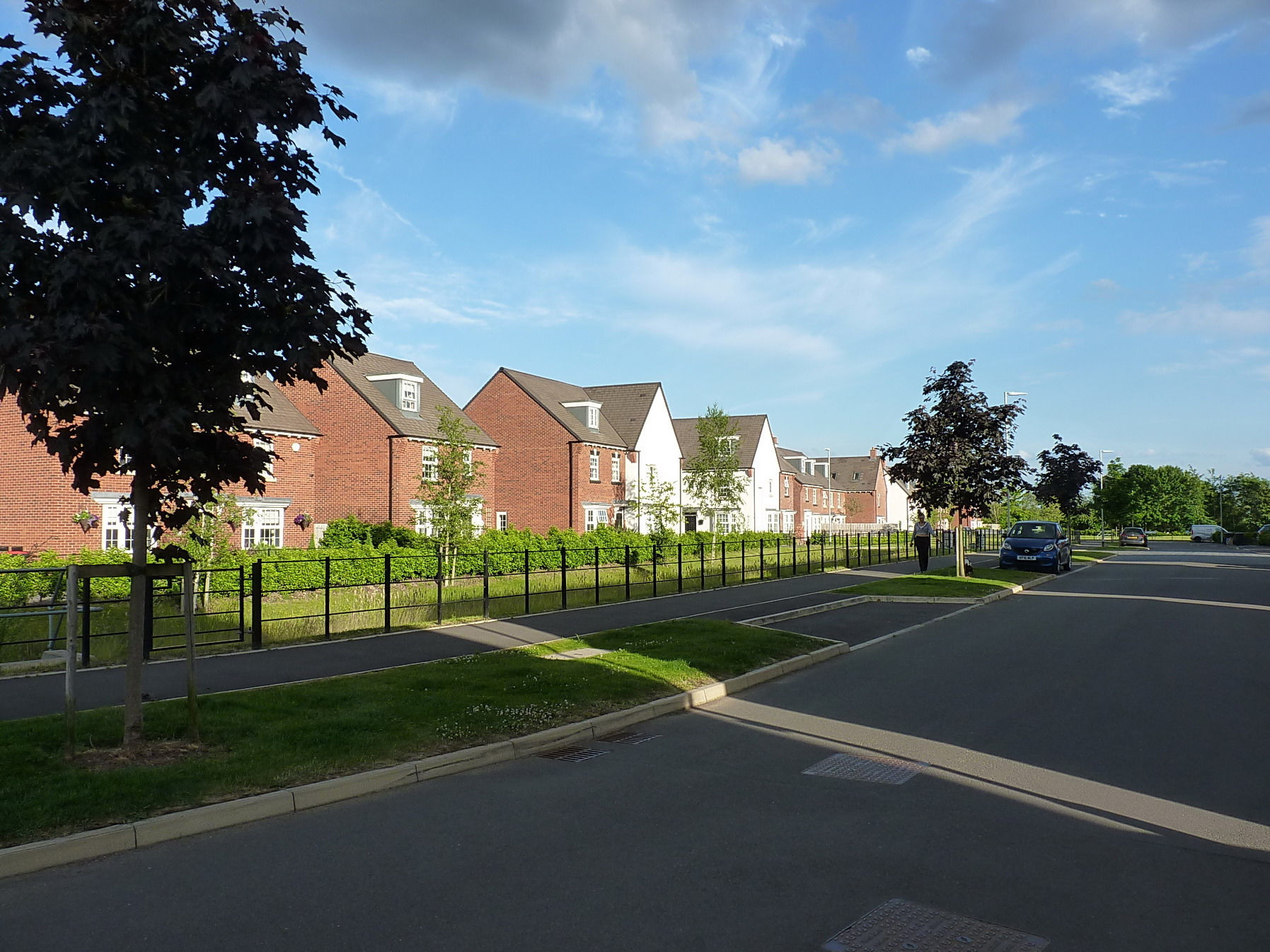
- Cullis Drive, Lightmoor Village

- Location within Shropshire
- OS grid reference: SJ681055
- Civil parish: Dawley Hamlets
- Unitary authority: Telford and Wrekin
- Ceremonial county: Shropshire
- Region: West Midlands
- Country: England
- Sovereign state: United Kingdom
- Post town: TELFORD
- Postcode district: TF4
- Dialling code: 01952
- Police: West Mercia
- Fire: Shropshire
- Ambulance: West Midlands
- UK Parliament: Telford

Lightmoor, also known as Lightmoor Village, is a village in the Telford and Wrekin borough in Shropshire, England It forms part of the Dawley Hamlets civil parish alongside Aqueduct, Doseley, Horsehay, Little Dawley and Spring Village.

== History ==
A working forge was recorded in the Dawley area as far back as 1180. By 1580 a forge and smithy were in operation at the Ridges, Lightmoor. These are commonly believed to be the starting point for the industries and growth that later developed during the industrial revolution. The hamlet then expanded to a mining village for the amount of industry around the area and Ironbridge Gorge. It also saw the opening of the Wellington to Craven Arms Railway and Shrewsbury and Birmingham Railway which built a branch from a junction with nearby Shifnal to Buildwas via Madeley, Lightmoor Platform, Coalbrookdale and Green Bank. The line between Lightmoor Junction and Wellington ceased operations in 1963 and the line between Shifnal and Ironbridge power station closed in 2015. The nearby Telford Steam Railway are currently expanding their line towards Lightmoor Junction and there are plans to reopen a station at Lightmoor. The area has also seen a brand new purpose-built garden village being built between Horsehay and the old Lightmoor settlement.

== Amenities ==
Lightmoor is primarily residential with the nearest amenities in Horsehay, Dawley and Telford. Although amenities are also located in the newly built Lightmoor Village estate.

== Transport ==
The area has bus services connecting it to Telford, Madeley, Dawley and Sutton Hill. The nearest railway stations are both Telford Central and Shifnal. The Telford Steam Railway also operate nearby at Horsehay and Dawley, Spring Village and Lawley Village.

== Sources ==
- British History Online
