= Lightmoor Platform railway station =

Disused railway station in Shropshire, England

Lightmoor Platform
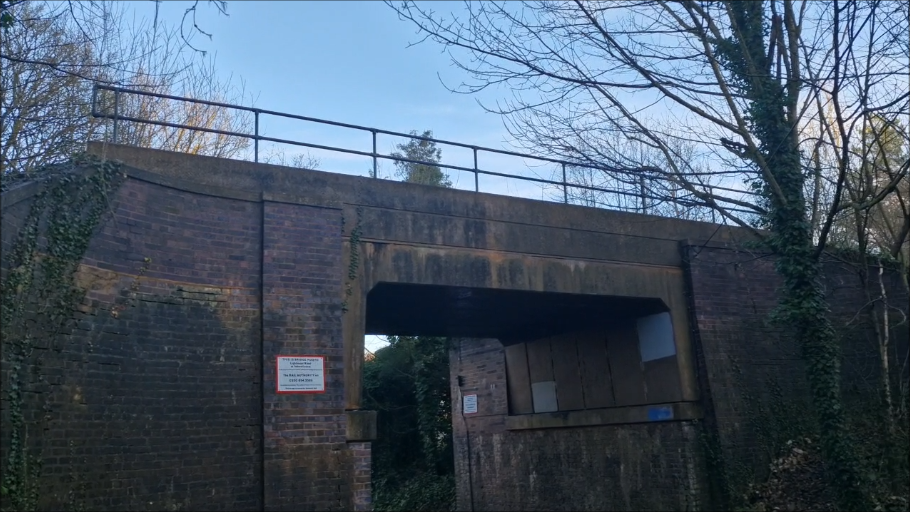

General information
- Location: Lightmoor and Doseley, Telford and Wrekin; England
- Coordinates: 52.6423°N 2.4746°W
- Grid reference: SJ679050
- Platforms: 2

Other information
- Status: Disused, possible station on a heritage railway

History
- Pre-grouping: Great Western Railway
- Post-grouping: Great Western Railway

Key dates
- 12 August 1907: Opened
- 1 January 1917: closed
- 23 June 1919: opened
- 23 July 1962: Closed
- 2015: Line to Ironbridge Power Station is closed
Location

Lightmoor Platform railway station was a station to serving the villages of Doseley and Lightmoor in Shropshire, England. The station was opened in 1907 and closed in 1962. The station was situated on the Madeley Junction to Buildwas Line to the west of Lightmoor Junction.

The site of the station and the former line to Ironbridge power station is currently mothballed with the Telford Steam Railway occupying part of the former Wellington to Craven Arms Railway. It is hoped that the line can be extended from Horsehay and Dawley to the site of Ironbridge power station. This would see new stations opened at Doseley, Lightmoor, Coalbrookdale and close to Buildwas for Ironbridge which includes proposals for a park and ride with passenger services between Ironbridge and Birmingham New Street.

Preceding station	Heritage railways	Following station
Coalbrookdale (Future)	Telford Steam Railway	Doseley (Future)

Preceding station	Disused railways	Following station
Green Bank Halt; Line open, station closed	Great Western Railway; Wellington to Craven Arms Railway	Doseley Halt; Line and station closed
Green Bank Halt; Line open, station closed	Great Western Railway; Shrewsbury and Birmingham Railway	Madeley; Line open, station closed
