= Doseley Halt railway station =

Former railway station in Shropshire, England

Doseley
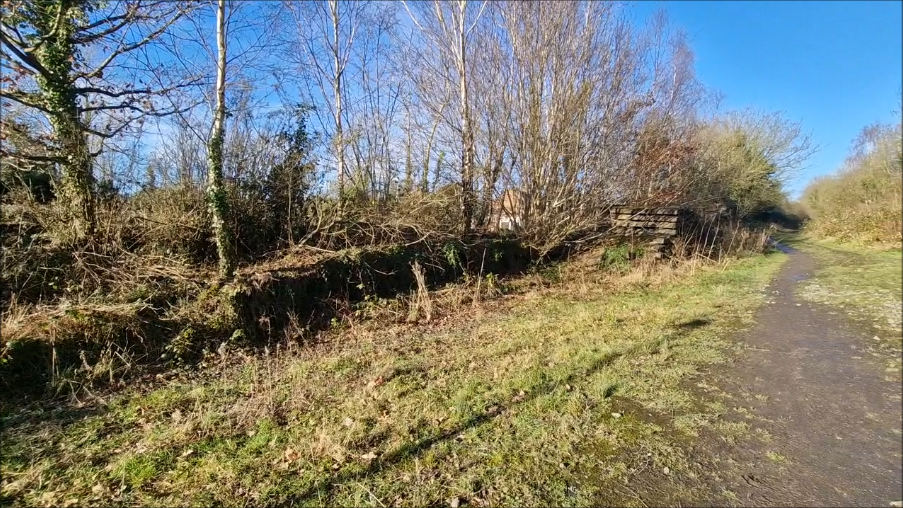
- Doseley Halt site and platform in 2025

General information
- Location: Doseley, Shropshire; England
- Coordinates: 52.6632°N 2.4820°W
- Grid reference: SJ675073
- System: Disused station due to reopen on heritage railway
- Platforms: 1

History
- Original company: Wellington and Severn Junction Railway
- Pre-grouping: Great Western Railway
- Post-grouping: Great Western Railway

Key dates
- December 1932: Opened
- 1962: Station and Line Closed
- 1976: Telford Steam Railway is formed
- 2024: Opening of the Telford Steam Railway to Doseley begins
Location

Doseley Halt railway station was a station serving the village of Doseley in Shropshire, England. The station was opened in 1932 and closed in 1962.

The station is the currently not in use and is eventually due to become part of the Telford Steam Railway alongside part of the former Wellington to Craven Arms Railway to Ironbridge power station. This would see new stations opened at Doseley, Lightmoor, Coalbrookdale and close to Buildwas for Ironbridge which includes proposals for a park and ride with passenger services between Ironbridge and Birmingham New Street.

Preceding station	Heritage railways	Following station
Horsehay and Dawley	Telford Steam Railway	Lightmoor (Future)

Preceding station	Disused railways	Following station
Horsehay and Dawley; Line and station open	Great Western Railway; Wellington to Craven Arms Railway	Lightmoor Platform; Line and station closed
