= Horsehay and Dawley railway station =

Heritage railway station in Shropshire, England

Horsehay and Dawley
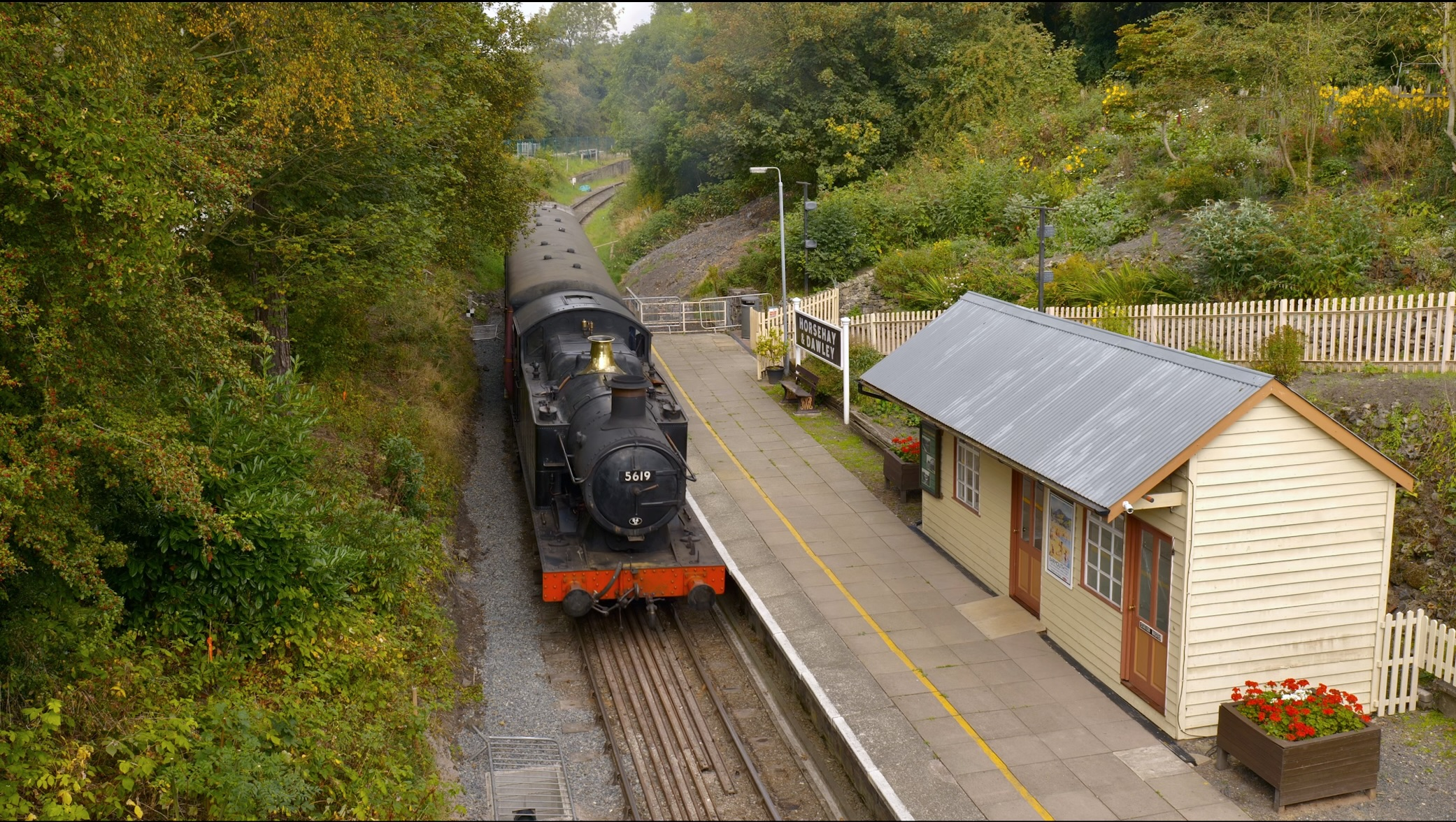
- Horsehay and Dawley in 2024, with a Class 5619 arriving on the Telford Steam Railway

General information
- Location: Horsehay and Dawley, Shropshire; England
- Coordinates: 52.6632°N 2.4820°W
- Grid reference: SJ675073
- System: Station on heritage railway
- Platforms: 1

History
- Original company: Wellington and Severn Junction Railway
- Pre-grouping: Great Western Railway
- Post-grouping: Great Western Railway

Key dates
- 2 May 1859: Opened
- 1962: Closed
- 1976: Reopened by the Telford Steam Railway
- 2024: Rebuilding of signal box begins
Location

Horsehay and Dawley railway station is a heritage railway station in the town of Dawley and village of Horsehay in the Telford and Wrekin borough of Shropshire, England.

== History ==
The station was opened in 1859, closed in 1962, then reopened in 1976 as part of the Telford Steam Railway. Originally, the station was on the former Wellington and Severn Junction railway. It consisted of one platform with a signal box at the end of the platform controlling access to the goods yard. It is now the working base of the Telford Steam Railway.

== Current heritage use ==
The station is the current southern terminus of the Telford Steam Railway alongside the adjacent Spring Village station and occupies part of the former Wellington to Craven Arms Railway. It is hoped that the line can be extended from Horsehay and Dawley to the site of Ironbridge power station. This would see new stations opened at Doseley, Lightmoor, Coalbrookdale and close to Buildwas for Ironbridge which includes proposals for a park and ride with passenger services between Ironbridge and Birmingham New Street.

Preceding station	Heritage railways	Following station
Lawley Village	Telford Steam Railway	Doseley (Future)

Preceding station	Disused railways	Following station
Lawley Bank; Line open, station closed	Great Western Railway; Wellington to Craven Arms Railway	Doseley Halt; Line and station closed
