= Little Dawley =

Village in Shropshire, England

Coordinates: 52.652371°N 2.468044°W

- Village
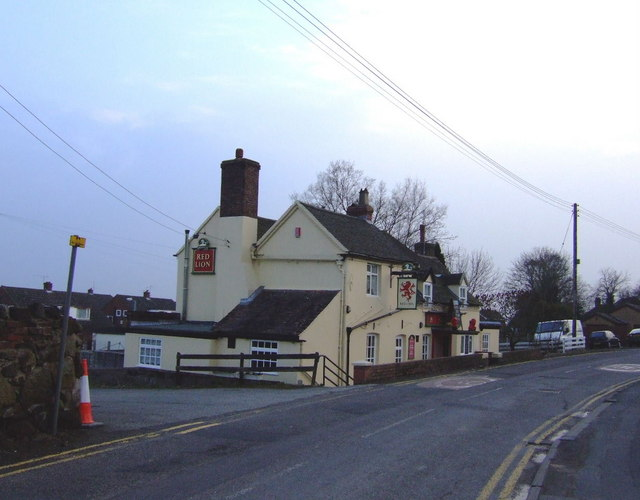
- The Red Lion

- Location within Shropshire
- OS grid reference: SJ683060
- Civil parish: Dawley Hamlets
- Unitary authority: Telford and Wrekin
- Ceremonial county: Shropshire
- Region: West Midlands
- Country: England
- Sovereign state: United Kingdom
- Post town: TELFORD
- Postcode district: TF4
- Dialling code: 01952
- Police: West Mercia
- Fire: Shropshire
- Ambulance: West Midlands
- UK Parliament: Telford

Little Dawley, formerly known as Dawley Parva, is a village in the Telford and Wrekin borough in Shropshire, England. It forms part of the Dawley Hamlets civil parish alongside Aqueduct, Doseley, Horsehay, Lightmoor and Spring Village.

== History ==
The villages history is intertwined with the nearby town of Dawley, having grown around the town and its development. It was historically one half of the town, known as Dawley Parva before being renamed to Little Dawley. Despite its proximity to the town, it is separate as a civil parish from Dawley.

== Amenities ==
The village is primarily a mix of residential, industrial and commercial. The main village centre is located on Holly Road.

== War memorial ==
The war memorial plaques from the redundant St Luke's Church, Doseley, were moved to a new parish war memorial erected in 1999 at Holly Road, Little Dawley. The memorial consists of a cross on a brick plinth with plaques relating to both World Wars on a roughly hewn stone within a gravelled area.

== Transport ==
The village has bus services connecting it to Telford, Madeley, Dawley and Sutton Hill. The nearest railway stations are both Telford Central and Shifnal. The Telford Steam Railway also operate nearby at Horsehay and Dawley, Spring Village and Lawley Village.

== Notable people ==
Samuel Peploe (1667-1752), later Bishop of Chester, was a native of Dawley Parva, where he was baptised.

Dalian Atkinson (1968-2016), former Aston Villa striker was living in Little Dawley at the time of his death in 2016.
