= Madeley =

Madeley may refer to:

== Places ==
- Madeley, Shropshire, a town, now part of the new town of Telford
- Madeley, Staffordshire, near Newcastle-under-Lyme
- Madeley, Western Australia, a suburb of Perth, Australia

== Other uses ==
- Madeley (surname)
- Madeley Wood Company, company
- Madeley Old Manor, medieval manor
- Madeley Old Hall, historic building
- Madeley High School

== See also ==
- Madeley railway station (disambiguation), for all stations named Madeley
- Madely (disambiguation)
- Madley
