= Doseley =

Village in Shropshire, England

Coordinates: 52.653647°N 2.475669°W

- Village
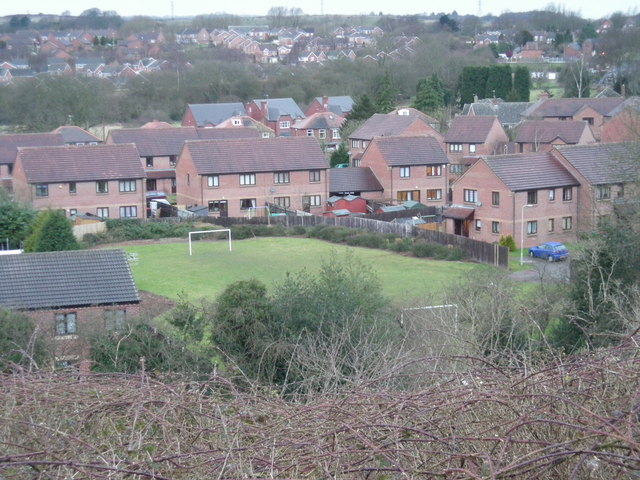
- Skyline of Doseley

- Location within Shropshire
- OS grid reference: SJ678067
- Civil parish: Dawley Hamlets
- Unitary authority: Telford and Wrekin
- Ceremonial county: Shropshire
- Region: West Midlands
- Country: England
- Sovereign state: United Kingdom
- Post town: TELFORD
- Postcode district: TF4
- Dialling code: 01952
- Police: West Mercia
- Fire: Shropshire
- Ambulance: West Midlands
- UK Parliament: Telford

Doseley is a village in the Telford and Wrekin borough in Shropshire, England. It forms part of the Dawley Hamlets civil parish alongside Aqueduct, Horsehay, Lightmoor, Little Dawley and Spring Village.

== History ==
The settlement was located in an area of coal mining and was served by the former Doseley Halt on the Wellington to Craven Arms Railway which closed in 1963. The station site is now overgrown and disused, although it is currently due to be reopened and reinstated by the Telford Steam Railway on their expansion towards Lightmoor Junction.

== St Luke's Church ==
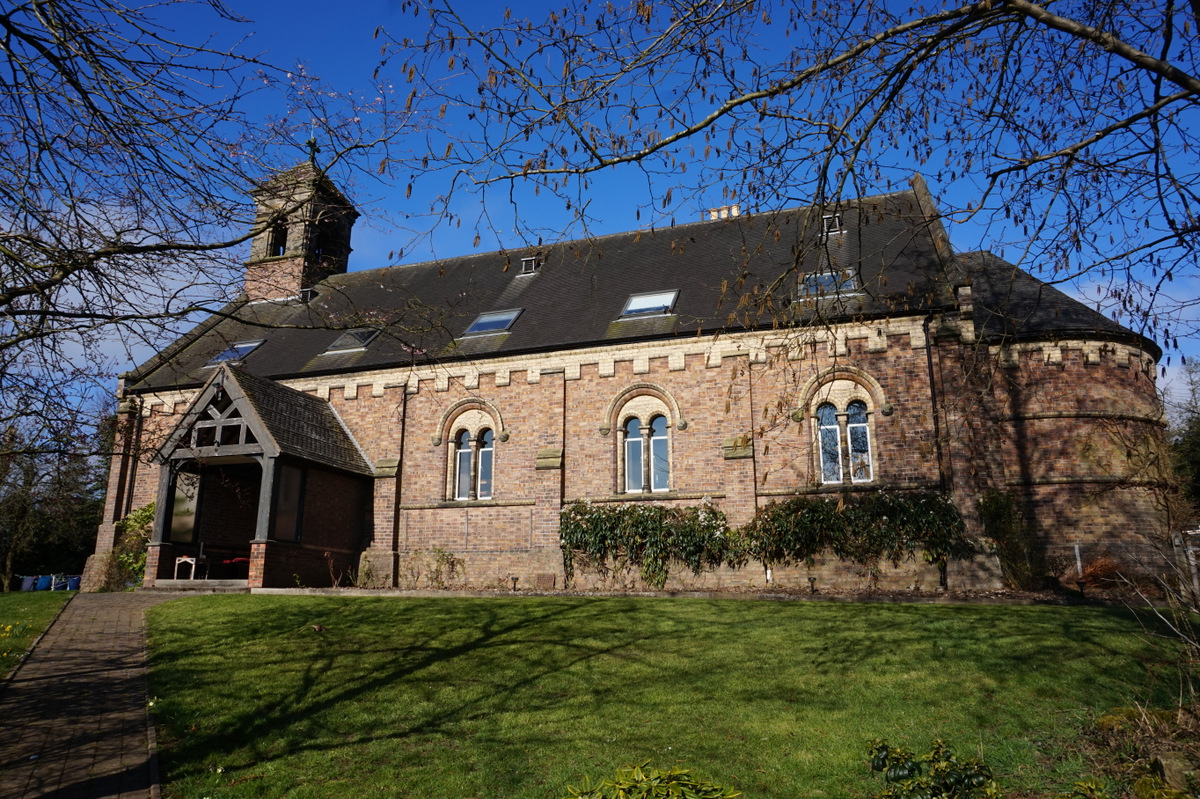
The former St Luke's Church, now a private residence

St Luke's church in Doseley was an Anglican church dedicated to Luke the Evangelist, built in 1845 to serve the new ecclesiastical parish of Dawley Parva (ie Little Dawley) which served the townships of Little Dawley and Horsehay. It was built in red brick in the Norman style and is grade II listed. The church was in use until 1975 when it was declared redundant, and became a private residence in 1980.

The war memorial plaques from the church were moved to a new parish war memorial erected in 1999 at Holly Road, Little Dawley.

== Transport ==
Doseley has no bus services passing through it, the nearest stops are in Horsehay, Lightmoor and Little Dawley. The nearest railway stations are Shifnal and Telford Central.
