= Madely =

Madely may refer to:

- Madeły, village in Poland

== People with the name ==
- Madely Beaugendre (born 1965), French athlete
- Steve Madely, Canadian radio host

== See also ==
- Madeley (disambiguation)
