= Wellington and Severn Junction Railway =

Railway line in Shropshire, England

The Wellington and Severn Junction Railway was a railway in Shropshire, England. It was built between 1857 and 1861. As part of the Wellington to Craven Arms Railway, it was operated by the Great Western Railway and subsequently the Western Region of British Railways. The line remained in use until its closure for passenger services in 1962.

== Construction ==
The authorisation for the Shrewsbury and Birmingham Railway (S&BR) in 1846 included a 4 1/4 mile branch line from near Ketley, a mile east of Wellington, to Coalbrookdale. Although they completed a separate branch line from near Shifnal to Madeley Court and Lightmoor (the "Madeley branch"), they did not proceed with the line from Ketley.

Wellington and Severn Junction Railway Act 1853
- Act of Parliament
- Parliament of the United Kingdom
- Long title: An Act for making a Railway from Wellington to Coalbrookdale, and an Extension to the River Severn, all in the County of Salop; and for other Purposes.
- Citation: 16 & 17 Vict. c. ccxiv

Dates
- Royal assent: 20 August 1853

Text of statute as originally enacted

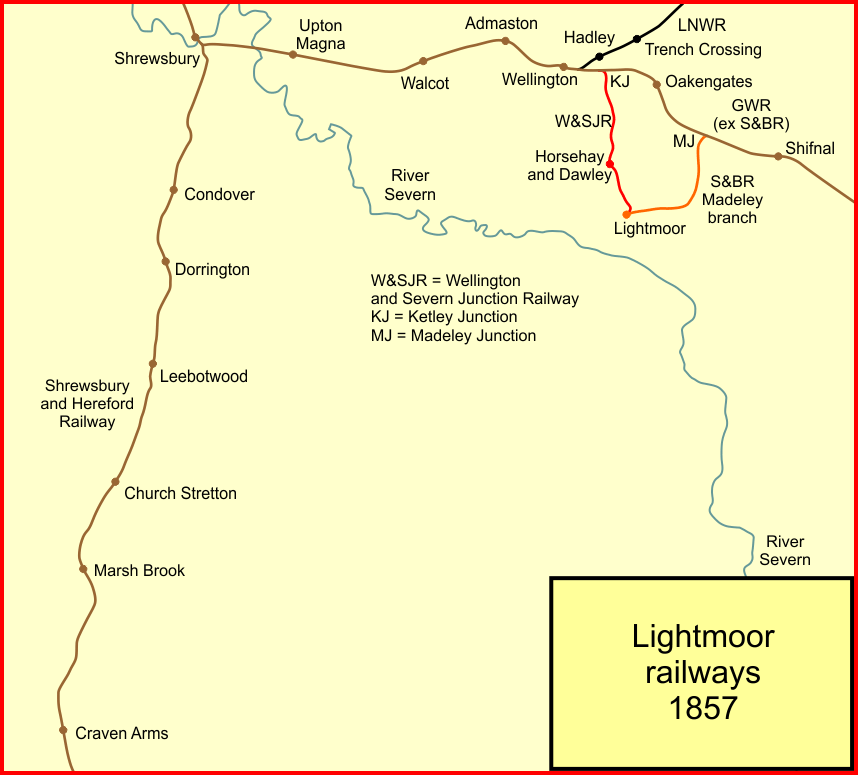
The W&SJR (red) and Madeley branch (orange)

John Dickson of the Shropshire Works, Wellington, had furnaces at Ketley, a mile or so south of Wellington, and in February 1851 he had opened a short private line from Waterloo Sidings, at Wellington, to Ketley. In 1852 the Coalbrookdale Company discussed extending Dickson's line to Coalbrookdale, but the cost was considered unaffordable, and a public company was promoted instead with the Coalbrookdale Company's backing: it was to be called the Wellington and Severn Junction Railway (W&SJR). The route was surveyed by John Barber of Wellington and plans drawn up by John McKenzie. Despite opposition from other railway companies, royal assent was given to the Wellington and Severn Junction Railway Act 1853 (16 & 17 Vict. c. ccxiv) on 20 August 1853. The cost of building the line between Ketley and Coalbrookdale was estimated at £60,000; the S&BR gave technical assistance and some financial help. The Act included provision for a future extension to Broseley on the south bank of the River Severn near Ironbridge, connecting with the planned Severn Valley Railway.

Henry Robertson and John Dickson were appointed as engineer and contractor in September 1853 and August 1854 respectively. Acquisition of land proved easier than elsewhere, suggesting that landowners saw the railway as an aid to their business interests. However raising finances proved difficult, and the W&SJR approached the GWR in April 1855 to ascertain if they would consider building the section between Lightmoor and Coalbrookdale.

Construction eventually started in August 1855 and focussed on the easier part of the line between Ketley and Horsehay. Once work began some 60% of the work had been completed in a little over six months. A demonstration run on the line from Ketley to Horsehay for shareholders took place on 21 February 1857. An inspection on 21 April by Captain Tyler for the Board of Trade required further work to be completed, but this was done in time for the line to be fully opened on 1 May 1857 for goods traffic only.

By early summer 1858 the line has been completed into Lightmoor. However a short extension was required in order to complete the junction with the Madeley and Lightmoor branch of the Great Western Railway, allowing trains to reverse direction there. (Note: The Shrewsbury and Birmingham Railway had been absorbed by the GWR in 1854.) Captain Ross inspected the line in March 1859 for the Board of Trade, again requiring deficiencies to be addressed. Hasty rectification was made, and the line was opened for passenger traffic between Ketley Junction and Lightmoor on 2 May 1859. Lightmoor was not a passenger destination in itself, being a centre of the iron industry, so in collaboration with the GWR, the passenger service ran from Wellington to Lightmoor Junction, reversing there, and then on to Shifnal via Madeley over the GWR (former S&BR) branch line.

The W&SJR could not raise enough money to build on from Lightmoor to Coalbrookdale, and the company decided to leave the completion in abeyance. However by 1860, proposals by the Wenlock Railway to extend from Buildwas through Coalbrookdale to Lightmoor quickly rendered this unnecessary. The connection was completed by the Wenlock Railway (to Coalbrookdale) and the GWR extension (to Lightmoor) in November 1864.

== Stations ==
- Ketley Junction; convergence with Shrewsbury and Birmingham Railway.
- Start of Wellington and Severn Junction Railway;
- Ketley; opened 2 May 1859; closed 23 July 1962;
- Ketley Town Halt; opened 6 March 1936; closed 23 July 1962;
- New Dale Halt; opened 29 January 1934; closed 23 July 1962;
- Lawley Bank; opened 2 May 1859; closed 23 July 1962;
- Lawley Village; Opened 2015 by the Telford Steam Railway
- Spring Village; Opened 1984 by the Telford Steam Railway
- Horsehay and Dawley; opened 2 May 1859; closed 23 July 1962; reopened 1984 by the Telford Steam Railway
- Doseley Halt opened 1 December 1932; closed 23 July 1962;
- Lightmoor Junction; convergence of S&BR Madeley branch;
- Lightmoor; opened 2 May 1859; closed 1 November 1864;
- Lightmoor Platform; opened 12 August 1907; closed 1 January 1917; reopened 23 June 1919; closed 23 July 1962;
- Start of GWR Coalbrookdale Extension;

== Operations ==
West Midland and Severn Valley Railway Companies Act 1861
- Act of Parliament
- Parliament of the United Kingdom
- Long title: An Act for authorizing the Construction of Railways from the Severn Valley Railway to the West Midland Railway near Kidderminster, and the leasing of the Wellington and Severn Junction Railway by the Great Western and West Midland Railway Companies; and for other Purposes.
- Citation: 24 & 25 Vict. c. ccxii

Dates
- Royal assent: 1 August 1861

The basis of the first operations on the W&SJR is not clear. Some histories suggest that the line was worked by the Coalbrookdale Company between 1857 and 1861. However the W&SJR directors' minutes for that period consistently state that it was operated by the GWR throughout. The GWR operated the passenger services from 1859 on a temporary basis "for accommodation of the public traffic", until terms were agreed in early 1861. After that it was leased to the West Midland Railway and the Great Western Railway jointly; the lease was ratified by the West Midland and Severn Valley Railway Companies Act 1861 (24 & 25 Vict. c. ccxii) of 1 August 1861. Following an agreement with the West Midland Railway the Wellington and Severn Junction Railway was operated by them. The WMR amalgamated with the GWR on 1 August 1863, keeping the name Great Western Railway, and the GWR then took over the working arrangement. The W&SJR remained as a separate company until finally being absorbed by the GWR on 7 August 1896 under the Great Western Railway (Additional Powers) Act 1896.

Lightmoor station, the former terminus of the W&SJR, closed on 1 November 1864 at the same time as the opening of the line between Buildwas and Lightmoor, with through services proceeding directly between Horsehay and Dawley and Coalbrookdale.

A GWR steam rail motor service was introduced on 1 May 1906, covering all areas of the Wellington to Craven Arms Railway. Five cars were allocated for this, with the three cars used in daily service stabled at Much Wenlock overnight, and two spares kept at Wellington. The railmotors' weakness was the small passenger capacity; hauling a trailer proved difficult on the steeply graded routes. An unusual configuration of two railmotors sandwiching a trailer car was used at busy times but proved to be unreliable. As a result they were considered unsuccessful on the Wenlock lines, and services reverted to locomotive hauled trans at the end of 1906. The patronage of the rail motor services indicated that there was a demand for a station at Lightmoor Junction. Construction of Lightmoor Platform was authorised in 1906, with wooden platforms being built on the site of the old W&SJR terminus. It opened on 12 August 1907 and was a fully staffed station, despite having the appearance of a typical GWR halt.

On 23 March 1915, passenger services from Lightmoor Junction to Shifnal via the Madeley branch were suspended indefinitely as a wartime economy measure. Post-war, passenger numbers on the former W&SJR peaked in the 1920s although this was not reflected elsewhere on the Wellington to Craven Arms Railway. The Madeley branch trains were reintroduced in early 1925 but discontinued after six months.

By the early 1930s passenger numbers were declining due to the growth in car usage and improved reliability of bus services. In response the GWR opened a series of unmanned halts along the Wellington to Craven Arms Railway. On the former W&SJR, Doseley Halt opened on 1 December 1932, New Dale Halt opened on 29 January 1934 and Ketley Town Halt opened on 6 March 1936.

== Closure ==
On 1 January 1948 the Wellington to Craven Arms Railway became part of the Western Region of British Railways. Traffic had become so light that the passenger service between Much Wenlock and Craven Arms was withdrawn on 31 December 1951. Passenger services between Wellington and Much Wenlock were withdrawn on 1 August 1962. Freight traffic on the former W&SJR lasted until 1983, when the line from Lightmoor Junction to Lawley was closed. However the line from Madeley Junction via Lightmoor Junction to Buildwas remained open for the transport of coal to Ironbridge Power Station until its closure in 2015.

The Telford Steam Railway operates as a heritage railway over a short length of the line between Lawley Bank (south of the original Lawley Station) and Horsehay & Dawley. The railway has ambitions to reopen the line towards Lightmoor Junction giving access to the extant Network Rail line to Coalbrookdale and Buildwas.
