= Dawley Hamlets =

Civil parish in Shropshire, England

Coordinates: 52.653°N 2.476°W

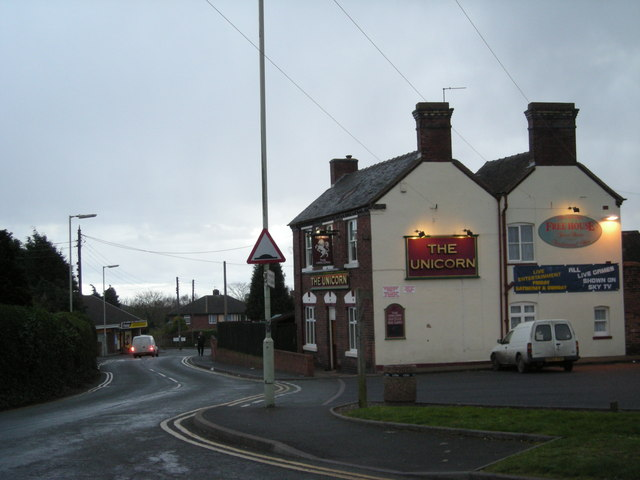
- The Unicorn, Little Dawley

- Location within Shropshire
- Area: 4.450 km^{2} (1.718 sq mi)
- Population: 8,008 (2021 census)
  - Density: 1,800/km^{2} (4,700/sq mi)
- Civil parish: Dawley Hamlets
- Unitary authority: Telford and Wrekin
- Ceremonial county: Shropshire
- Region: West Midlands
- Country: England
- Sovereign state: United Kingdom
- Police: West Mercia
- Fire: Shropshire
- Ambulance: West Midlands

Dawley Hamlets is a civil parish in the Telford and Wrekin district, in the ceremonial county of Shropshire, England.

The parish covers Horsehay, Doseley, Little Dawley (also traditionally known as Dawley Parva), Lightmoor and Aqueduct.

In 2021 the parish had a population of 8,008. The parish was formed on 1 April 1988.

The name Dawley comes from Old English meaning woodland clearing associated with a man called Dealla.

== See also ==
- Listed buildings in Dawley Hamlets
- William Ball (Shropshire Giant), buried at St Luke's Church, Doseley
