= Madeley railway station =

Madeley railway station may refer to several stations in England:

- Madeley railway station (Staffordshire) (1837–1952), on the Grand Junction Railway
- Madeley railway station (Shropshire) (1837–1925), on the Great Western Railway
- Madeley Market railway station (1861–1960), in Shropshire, on the London and North Western Railway
- Madeley Road railway station (1870–1931), in Staffordshire, on the North Staffordshire Railway

== See also ==
- Madeley Junction (disambiguation)
