= Aqueduct, Shropshire =

Village in Shropshire, England

Coordinates: 52.647855°N 2.4603152°W

Aqueduct
- Village and suburban area
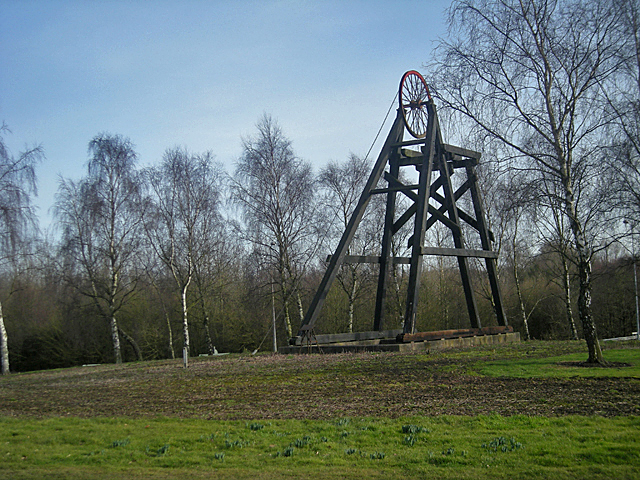
- Pithead structure on Castlefields roundabout

- Location within Shropshire
- OS grid reference: SJ689056
- Civil parish: Dawley Hamlets
- Unitary authority: Telford and Wrekin
- Ceremonial county: Shropshire
- Region: West Midlands
- Country: England
- Sovereign state: United Kingdom
- Post town: TELFORD
- Postcode district: TF4
- Dialling code: 01952
- Police: West Mercia
- Fire: Shropshire
- Ambulance: West Midlands
- UK Parliament: Telford

Aqueduct is a village and suburban area of Telford in the Telford and Wrekin borough in Shropshire, England. It forms part of Dawley Hamlets civil parish and is the name of a parish electoral ward.

== History ==
Aqueduct village was built around the 1790s following the opening of the Shropshire Canal to connect to the mines and foundries around the nearby town of Oakengates. Its name is taken from the sandstone aqueduct that crosses the turnpike road in the village. Following the development of the village, the nearby Wellington to Craven Arms Railway passed to the west of the village with stations at both Doseley and Lightmoor Platform. Additionally, the former Coalport branch line ran to the east of the village. The nearest station on that line was Dawley and Stirchley. It became part of the Telford and Wrekin borough in the 1960s and 1970s following construction of the nearby town of Telford.

== Amenities ==
Aqueduct is primarily a mix of residential, industrial and commercial with its main centre on Majestic Way.

== St Paul's Church ==
A mission church on Aqueduct Road, dedicated to Paul the Apostle, was opened in 1851 for James Foster of Madeley Court. It was closed in 1951 after being handed to the then vicar of Madeley and closed as a church not long after. It became a scout hut before becoming a private residence.

== Transport ==
The village has bus services connecting it to Telford, Wellington, Madeley, Dawley and Sutton Hill. The nearest railway stations are both Telford Central and Shifnal. The Telford Steam Railway also operate nearby at Horsehay and Dawley, Spring Village and Lawley Village.
