= Listed buildings in Dawley Hamlets =

Dawley Hamlets is a civil parish in the district of Telford and Wrekin, Shropshire, England. The parish contains 14 listed buildings that are recorded in the National Heritage List for England. All the listed buildings are designated at Grade II, the lowest of the three grades, which is applied to "buildings of national importance and special interest". The parish includes the settlements of Dawley, Doseley, and Horsehay. The listed buildings include houses and cottages, a farmhouse, a former canal aqueduct and bridge, a chapel, a church, offices, and a railway bridge.

== Buildings ==
Name and location	Photograph	Date	Notes
Ivy Farmhouse; 52.65108°N 2.47197°W	—	Early 17th century	The farmhouse was altered in the 18th and 19th centuries. It is timber framed with brick infill, and has been roughcast and painted on the front, and has tiled roofs. There is one storey and an attic, originally with a hall range and a projecting gabled cross-wing, and a later brick wing to the left. The windows are a mix of casements and sashes, and there is a small gabled dormer.
Old Row Cottages; 52.66208°N 2.48579°W	—	18th century	A row of 15 brick cottages with tile roofs. Each cottage has two storeys, two bays, and casement windows, those in the upper floor under small gables, and in the lower floor with cambered heads. At the rear of each cottage is a gabled extension.
Lightmoor Furnaces; 52.64487°N 2.47110°W	—	1770s	The remains of early blast furnaces. What is visible consists of curved brick walling.
Former canal aqueduct 52.64776°N 2.45218°W		c. 1788	The aqueduct was built by the Shropshire Union Canal to carry a branch of the canal over a track, and it has since been converted into a footpath. It is in sandstone and consists of a single elliptical arch flanked by abutments.
Former canal bridge 52.64940°N 2.47004°W		c. 1790	The bridge was built to carry a branch of the Shropshire Union Canal under a trackway. It is in red brick on a sandstone plinth, and forms a barrel vaulted tunnel about 5 metres (16 ft) long. There are abutments in stone and slag at each end.
Squatters Cottage; 52.65059°N 2.47974°W	—	1797	The cottage was extended in the 19th century. It is in sandstone and brick, and has a tile roof hipped to the right. There is a single storey, it has been extended from one bay to three, and has doorways and casement windows.
24 Pool View; 52.66288°N 2.48616°W	—	Early 19th century	The house is in brick with modillion eaves and a tile roof. There are two storeys and three bays. Most windows are casements, and at the rear is a small round-headed cast iron window.
New Row Cottages; 52.66346°N 2.48669°W	—	Early 1830s	A row of twelve brick cottages with a tile roof. Each cottage has two storeys, a moulded eaves cornice, two bays, and casement windows with hood moulds. In the centre is a doorway, some with later porches, and some with ornamental keystones.
Store abutting No. 15 Holly Road; 52.65070°N 2.46972°W	—	1837	The building probably originated as a meeting room for a Sunday school and was later used for other purposes. It is in Coalbrookdale brick with a tile roof, and two storeys. On the sides are casement windows, and at the south end is a round-arched window.
Wesleyan Chapel; 52.65056°N 2.47024°W		1837	The Methodist chapel is in Classical style, in brick, with a tile roof. It has two storeys and three bays on the front and four on the sides. The bays on the front are divided by brick pilasters, and at the top is a truncated gable with a parapet and a cornice over the middle bay. In the centre is a doorway with pilasters and an entablature, the windows in the ground storey are flat-headed, in the upper storey they have round heads, and in the gable is an inscribed tablet. Along the sides are round-headed windows.
St Luke's Church; 52.65579°N 2.47823°W		1845	The church, which is now redundant and has been converted into a house, is in red brick with yellow brick dressings and a tile roof. The church is in Norman style, and consists of a nave and chancel in one unit, a semicircular apse with a semi-conical roof, a north vestry, and a timber south porch. On the west end of the nave is a square stone belfry with a pyramidal roof. The windows have two lights and are round-headed.
Horsehay Works Offices; 52.66110°N 2.48637°W		19th century	The offices are on a corner site, and are in red brick with tile roofs. There are two storeys, and two ranges forming an L-shaped plan, one with eight, and the other with ten bays. Some windows have metal frames, and others are casements.
Coach House and Stables north of New Row Cottages; 52.66391°N 2.48716°W	—	19th century	The coach house and stables is a building in brick with a hipped tile roof. It has two storeys and a single-storey wing. In the ground floor are five cart bays divided by brick piers, and in the upper floor are a loft door and two windows.
Railway Bridge west of Cheshire Cheese public house 52.65709°N 2.47695°W		c. 1858	The bridge was built by the Wellington and Severn Junction Railway to carry its line over Doseley Road. It is in yellow brick with stone dressings, and with repairs in blue engineering brick. The bridge consists of a single segmental arch with a stone parapet, and it is flanked by piers and abutment wings with small end piers.
