= Green Bank Halt railway station =

Disused railway station in Shropshire, England

Green Bank Halt
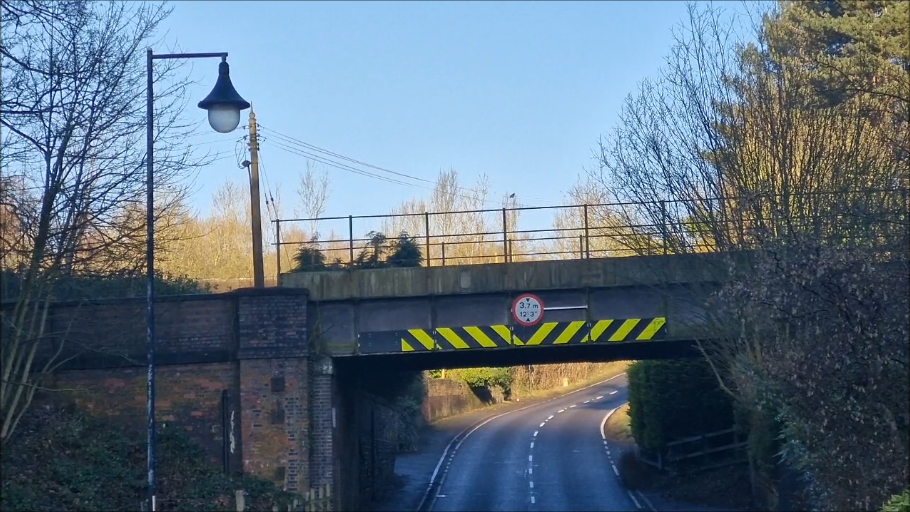

General information
- Location: Coalbrookdale and Little Wenlock, Telford and Wrekin; England
- Coordinates: 52.6416°N 2.4912°W
- Grid reference: SJ668049
- Platforms: 2

Other information
- Status: Disused

History
- Post-grouping: Great Western Railway

Key dates
- 12 March 1934: Opened
- 23 July 1962: Closed
Location

Green Bank Halt railway station was a station that served both the town of Coalbrookdale and village of Little Wenlock in Shropshire, England. The station was opened in 1934 and closed in 1962.

Preceding station	Disused railways	Following station
Coalbrookdale; Line open, station closed	Great Western Railway; Wellington to Craven Arms Railway	Lightmoor Platform; Line open, station closed
