= Green Wood Centre =

Centre for the Coppice Revival

The Green Wood Centre in Coalbrookdale, Shropshire – formerly the Green Wood Trust, which was formed in 1984 with the help of many volunteers and specialists who were concerned about the environment – is now the home of the Small Woods Association a registered charity.

== The buildings ==
=== Woodland College ===
Woodland College, designed for the Green Wood Trust by architects Simmonds Mills, is an example of sustainable architecture. The design incorporates high levels of energy efficiency and an innovative timber structure utilising local timber.

The main support columns are sweet chestnut tree trunks concreted into place. Upper structure are peeled ash logs that could be replaced if necessary. Other species used in the College are Douglas fir (window frames and external cladding), European larch (wall studs, ceiling rafters and also external cladding) and English oak for the window sub sills.

Woodland College is used as an office space, a teaching room for woodland craft courses, a conference venue and for community events. The Woodland College holds 70 people seated and 100 standing.

==== Woodland College efficiency ====
The Woodland College has several environmentally friendly features.

Solar radiation – The orientation of the building enables the optimum usage of solar energy entering the building.

Heat exchangers – The heat exchangers take the heat from outgoing air and preheat the cold, fresh incoming air, which is then sent around the building. It is calculated that the heat exchangers will maintain an average temperature of 11 degrees Celsius, which means that only a small use of the heating system is needed to top up the building's requirements.

Windows – incorporating double-glazed units and low emissivity glass, together with insulated spacer bars and extra deep window frames. The windows thus allow more heat in over the year than they let escape.

Heat storage – The internal walls are built using dense concrete blocks in order to store heat gained during warmer periods and retain warmth in the colder periods. This helps to maintain the temperature inside the building while the outside temperature fluctuates.

=== The Station House ===
Green Wood Centre is situated on the old Coalbrookdale railway station site. The once-derelict Station House has been restored and now houses the head office for the Small Woods Association.

=== The Cruck Barn ===
The Cruck framed or Coracle Barn was constructed in 1988. The barn is made from wood sourced from the Gorge. The frame is made from oak, ash and elm whilst the roof is covered with chestnut shingles and the wall panels are woven hazel and sweet chestnut. The design is based upon a Herefordshire cruck barn at Avoncroft Museum of Historic Buildings in Bromsgrove, Worcestershire.

A display of coracles is held in the Cruck Barn for the general public to view. Coracles have a long history in Ironbridge. As there was a toll for using the bridge, locals would use a coracle instead to cross the river. They were also used to collect driftwood and, if the floods had trapped an animal, the coraclemen would paddle across to net them, giving them a reputation as poachers.

== Wood fuel at Green Wood Centre ==
Green Wood Centre uses wood fuel in a Froling 50 kW Log Burner. A heated main runs the length of the site heating all four main buildings. The boiler is situated in a boiler house attached to the Cruck Barn. The boiler burns around one wheelbarrow's worth of logs a day during early spring and autumn but the load varies between summer and winter.

Hot water passes through the burn chamber and is stored in a buffer tank in the Cruck Barn. The well-insulated water can stay hot for a week. The water travels along the pipes to the buildings where the thermostatic controls have been switched on. The logs are sourced from local coppiced woods that are currently being restored by Small Woods volunteers.

The system was installed in December 2005 and since then has not only reduced considerably the amount of electricity used on site but also has helped the restoration of local woodlands and improved conditions for biodiversity and timber production. The system was installed with the help of a grant given by the Onyx Environmental Trust.

== Reed bed system ==
In 1990 a reed bed sewage system was installed at Green Wood Centre. A reed bed system purifies and recycles all waste water from toilets, sinks and showers. It avoids the need for an expensive water cleansing and processing through a mains system. The purified water leads to a clean pond near the site entrance.

== The Green Wood Café ==
Situated in The Green Wood Centre next door to the Woodland College is The Green Wood Café, a family-run coffeeshop that has been open since June 2016, serving artisan espresso-based coffees, teas, cakes and a variety of light lunches, snacks etc. (inc. many gluten-free and vegan options). What's On at The Green Wood Café: Fortnightly Street Food Evenings - Fridays 5-9pm, vegan and gluten-free friendly. Fortnightly Sunday Brunch Chill - brunch, coffee, cake and music, including jazz and blues. Monthly Late Night Opening & Hobby Night - Board Games, Crafts, Food, Drink... More details here.

== See also ==
- Cider
- Coracle
- Basket making
- Hedge laying
- Coppicing
- Ironbridge
- Ironbridge Gorge
- Telford
