= William Ball (Shropshire Giant) =

Shropshire iron puddler

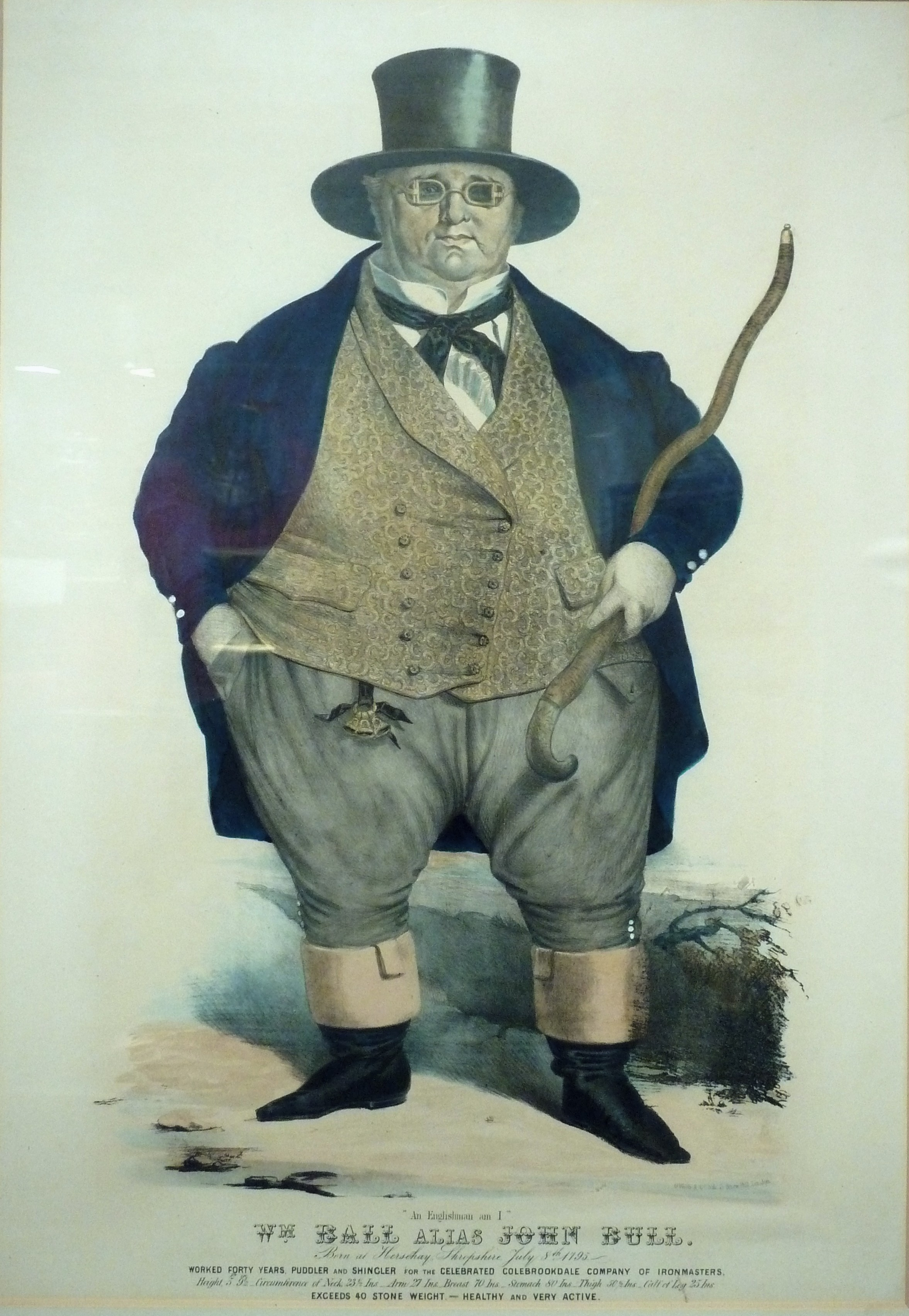
- A lithographic print at the Museum of the Gorge, Ironbridge
- Born: June 1795
- Died: June 1852 (aged 57)
- Burial place: St Luke's Church, Doseley; 52.6561508°N 2.4782962°W
- Other names: Big Billy Ball; 'The Shropshire Giant'; 'John Bull'
- Occupations: Iron puddler and shingler
- Employer: Coalbrookdale Company
- Known for: His great size, weight and strength
- Height: 5 ft 9 in (1.75 m)
- Spouses: Mary Bailey (d. 1824); Margaret Wood (1790 - c.1850)
- Children: 2

William Ball (June 1795 – 24 June 1852), the "Shropshire Giant", was a nineteenth-century iron puddler and "giant".

As an adult he was 5 feet 9 inches (1.75 m) tall and weighed more than forty stone (560 pounds, 254 kg).

== Early life ==
He was born in June 1795 in Horsehay, Great Dawley, Shropshire. His exact date of birth is unrecorded, but he was baptised on 8 July. He was the first son of five children born to Thomas and Elizabeth Ball of Horsehay.

== Ironworker ==
From the age of eight he was employed in the Coalbrookdale Company's Horsehay Ironworks, where he worked mostly as a puddler and later as a shingler.

'Big Billy Ball' was immensely strong, on one occasion reputedly lifting a piece of iron weighing nearly 9 long hundredweight (460 kg; 1,000 lb) to place under the forge hammer.

In 1843 he was accidentally blinded in one eye when he was struck by a piece of molten iron. After this he always wore a pair of glass goggles. He also ceased working in the ironworks after 40 years.

== John Bull ==
After he left the ironworks he exhibited himself around county fairs as a "rara avis", appearing under the pseudonym 'John Bull'.

1850 saw the birth of Alfred Darby II, a descendant of the Darby family, which was to be celebrated by a procession. He was chosen to lead this procession on horseback, along with 'Little Bennie Poole', the smallest man working at the Coalbrookdale Company, riding a pony. Because of his size, he had to be hoisted onto his horse with a block and tackle, with a cry of, "Dunno yo drop me!". Afterwards the horse was so injured that it had to be destroyed.

=== The Great Exhibition ===
He was invited, as both a guest and a celebrity exhibit, to The Great Exhibition of 1851 in London. As no passenger seat on the train to London was big enough for him, he travelled in the guard's van.

Some Birmingham businessmen were said to have teased him about his size: they asked him how much material would be needed and what the cost would be to make him a suit, but after he quipped that if they would take him to a tailor, have him measured and pay for a suit, he would give them the information they wanted, after they did not bother him anymore.

He did not enjoy his experience of London and was also targeted by thieves. He left wishing never to return and had no desire to travel from Horsehay again.

== Personal life and death ==
In September 1819, Ball married Mary Bailey; they had two children. After Mary's death, he married Margaret Wood, with whom he had no children.

Ball died the year after his appearance at The Great Exhibition, at 24 June 1852, at the age of 57.

== See also ==
- Daniel Lambert (1770–1809)
