= Madeley Junction =

Madeley Junction may refer to two locations on the British railway system:

- Madeley Junction, Shropshire, between Wolverhampton and Shrewsbury
- Madeley Junction, Staffordshire, between Stafford and Crewe
