= Steve Madely =

Canadian radio personality

- Presenting career
- Show: Madely in the Morning
- Station: CFRA Ottawa
- Time slot: Weekdays 6 am to 9 am
- Style: Talk radio News radio
- Country: Canada
- Website: web.archive.org/web/20040811224830/http://cfra.com/hosts/steve.asp

Steve Madely was an Ottawa, Ontario radio host on CFRA. He got his start in 1964 at CHWO in Oakville, Ontario before eventually joining CFRA in 1981. He was the host of the station's weekday morning show Madely in the Morning, weekdays from 6 am to 9 am. The show featured Madely's top five stories of the day which are reiterated over the show, a 10-minute-long listener call-in session at 6:40, health headlines at 6:55, and weird and wacky stories at 7:55.

On November 16, 2015, Madely officially retired from CFRA and his radio broadcast career.
