= Coalbrookdale railway station =

Disused railway station in Shropshire, England

Coalbrookdale
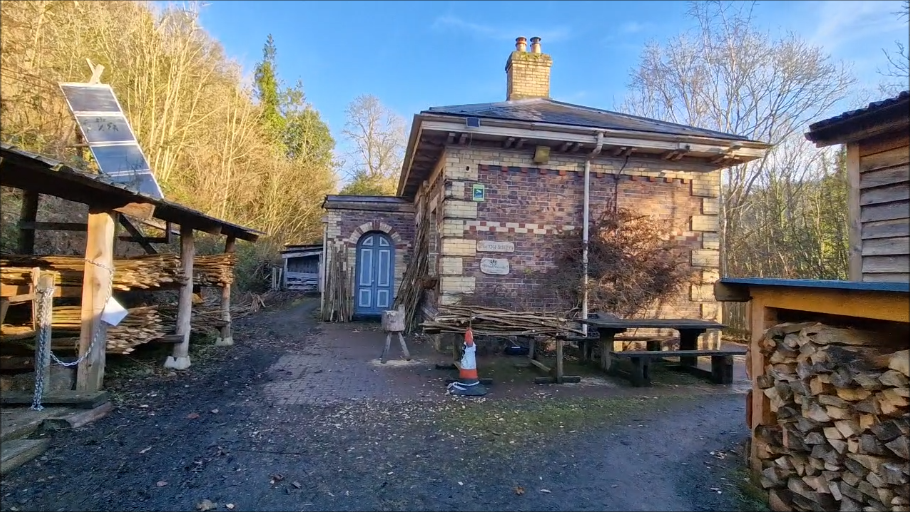
- Coalbrookdale station in 2025

General information
- Location: Coalbrookdale and Ironbridge, Telford and Wrekin; England
- Coordinates: 52.6336°N 2.4923°W
- Grid reference: SJ667040

Other information
- Status: Disused

History
- Original company: Wellington and Severn Junction Railway
- Pre-grouping: Great Western Railway
- Post-grouping: Great Western Railway

Key dates
- 1 November 1864: Opened
- 23 July 1962: Closed
Location

Coalbrookdale railway station is a disused station that served both Coalbrookdale and Ironbridge in Shropshire, England. The station was situated on the now mothballed freight-only line between Buildwas Junction and Lightmoor Junction. The station buildings are now used by the Green Wood Centre.

In 1979, British Rail ran summer Sunday services to a temporary station, Telford (Coalbrookdale), in collaboration with the Telford Development Corporation and the Ironbridge Gorge Museum Trust. The temporary station was not far from the former Coalbrookdale station, which closed 17 years earlier.

The Telford Steam Railway has aspirations to take possession of the up track passing through the station as part of its southern extension.

The station building at Longville (another station on the Wenlock, Craven Arms and Lightmoor Extension railway) was a similar but reduced version of that at Coalbookdale.

Coalbrookdale railway station is a waypoint on the South Telford Heritage Trail.

Preceding station	Disused railways	Following station
Buildwas; Line open, station closed	Great Western Railway; Wellington to Craven Arms Railway	Green Bank Halt; Line open, station closed
