= Madeley (surname) =

Madeley is a surname. Notable people with the surname include:

- Anna Madeley (born 1976), actress
- Chloe Madeley (born 1987), television presenter
- Darrin Madeley (born 1968), ice hockey player
- Paul Madeley (born 1944), footballer
- Richard Madeley (born 1956), television presenter
- Ruth Madeley (born 1987), actress
- Vincent Madeley Harris (1913–1988), bishop
