= Madeley railway station (Shropshire) =

Former railway station in England

Madeley
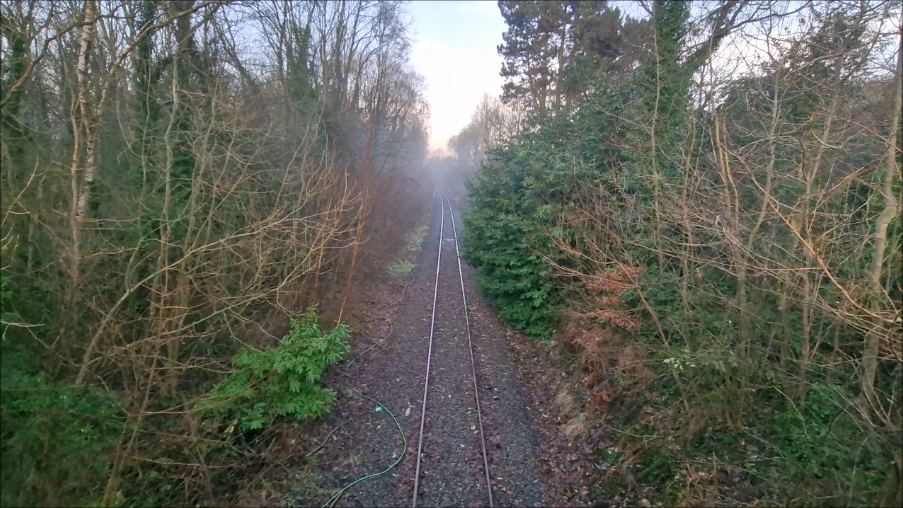

General information
- Location: Madeley, Telford and Wrekin; England
- Coordinates: 52.6450°N 2.4470°W
- Grid reference: SJ698053

Other information
- Status: Disused

History
- Pre-grouping: Great Western Railway
- Post-grouping: Great Western Railway

Key dates
- 2 May 1859: Opened as Madeley Court
- 4 June 1897: Renamed Madeley
- 22 March 1915: Closed
- 13 July 1925: Reopened
- 21 September 1925: Closed
Location

Madeley railway station is a disused railway station that served the town of Madeley in Shropshire, England. The station was opened by the Great Western Railway in 1859 as Madeley Court. In 1897 it was renamed simply Madeley. The station was closed in 1915 but reopened in July 1925 only to close permanently in September of the same year.

| Preceding station | Historical railways | Following station |
|---|---|---|
| Lightmoor Platform; Line open, station closed | Great Western Railway; Madeley Branch | Shifnal; Line open, station open |
