= Buildwas railway station =

Former railway station in Shropshire, England

Buildwas
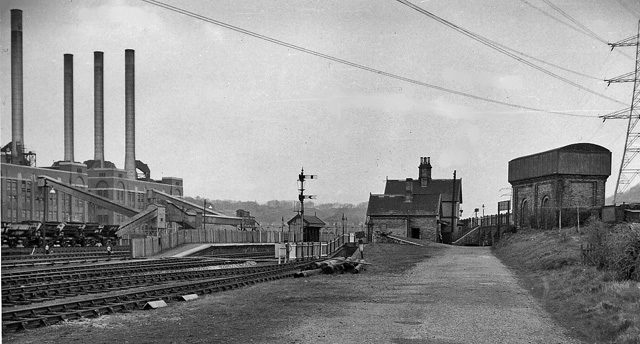
- The station in 1962

General information
- Location: Buildwas, Shropshire; England
- Coordinates: 52.6342°N 2.5167°W
- Grid reference: SJ651041
- Platforms: 3

Other information
- Status: Disused

History
- Original company: Severn Valley Railway
- Pre-grouping: Great Western Railway
- Post-grouping: Great Western Railway

Key dates
- 1 February 1862: Opened
- 9 September 1963: Closed
Location

Buildwas railway station was an isolated junction railway station on the Wellington to Craven Arms Railway and Severn Valley Railway. Opened on 1 February 1862. Although the station served both the Severn Valley Railway and Wellington to Craven Arms Railway, it was an interchange station in open countryside with no passenger access except by rail.

The station had three platforms, with two platforms at a lower level serving the Severn Valley Railway and one at a higher level serving the Wellington to Craven Arms Railway. At its peak, the station had a total of eleven staff, including the station master. Up to 1923 the area was controlled by two signal boxes, the Station signal box controlling the station area and the Junction signal box controlling the junction between the Severn Valley line and the double track line across the Albert Edward Bridge towards Lightmoor Junction. These were replaced with a single signal box approximately midway between its predecessors in 1923. This box was subsequently enlarged to accommodate a frame containing 113 levers on 9 December 1931. The track layout was altered several times during its existence including the additional CEGB sidings opened in 1932.

The planned closure of the northern end of the Severn Valley Line including Buildwas station pre-dated the Beeching report. Following closure, the station was demolished to make way for Ironbridge B Power Station. Coal for the power station was offloaded close to the site of the original station until the power station stopped generating electricity in November 2015.

The Telford Steam Railway has aspirations to operate to this site, running over the Albert Edward Bridge to a new terminus on or close to the site of Buildwas station.

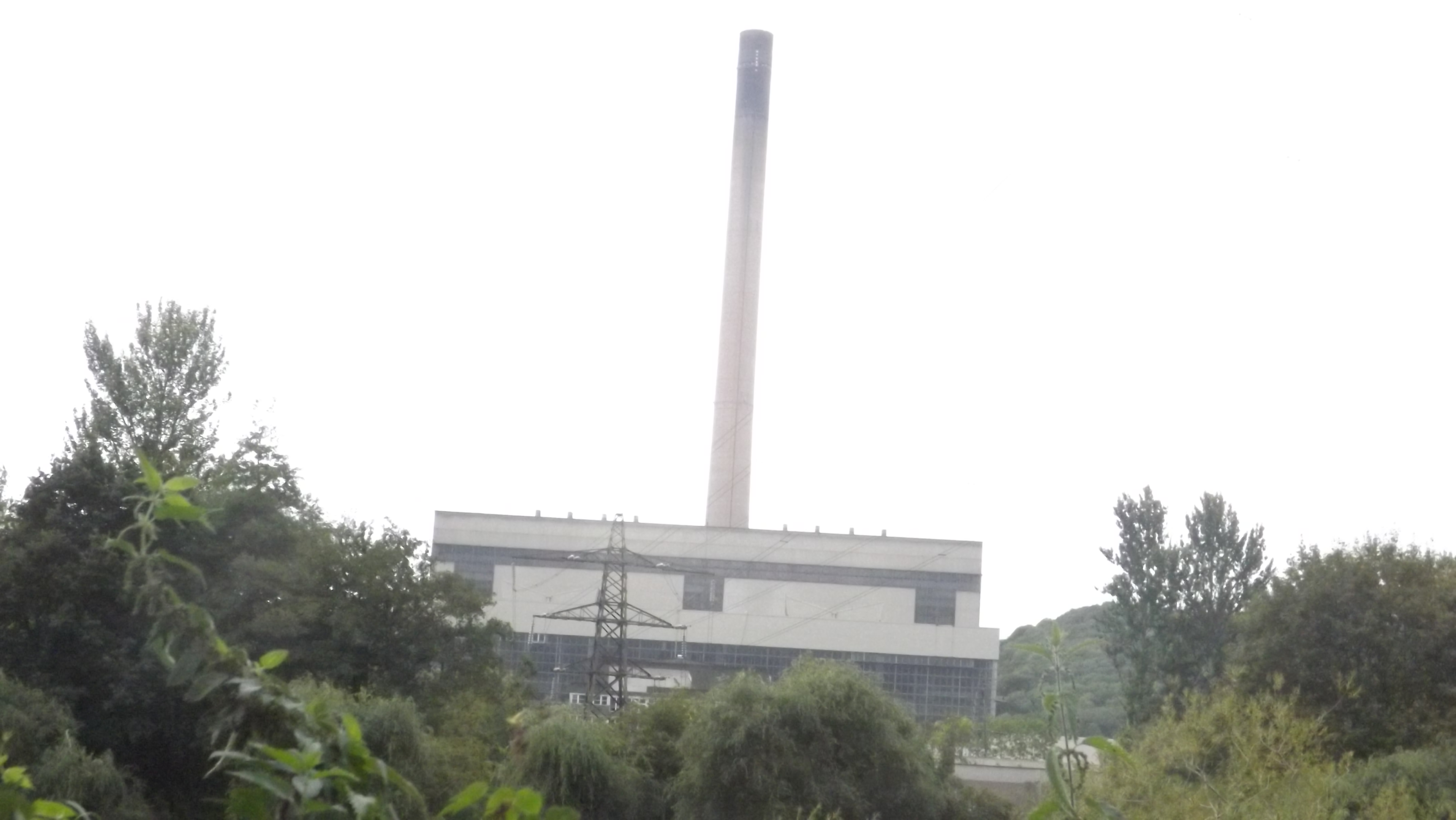
Site of Buildwas station in 2018

Preceding station	Disused railways	Following station
Cressage; Line and station closed	Great Western Railway; Severn Valley Railway	Ironbridge and Broseley; Line and station closed
Coalbrookdale; Line open, station closed	Great Western Railway; Wellington to Craven Arms Railway	Farley Halt; Line and station closed

== Power Station Regeneration Project ==
The Ironbridge Power station closed in 2015 and the site was decommissioned by Uniper until sold to the Harworth Group in June 2018. Regeneration of the site is set to include approximately 1000 new homes with the potential of the reopening of a train station on the site. Both Telford Steam Railway and National Rail have expressed interest in the reintroduction of both heritage and passenger services to the site using the disused tracks, which currently links the power station to the Birmingham-Shrewsbury line near Telford. Harworth Group's planning proposal was initially rejected by Shropshire Council in August 2021 over a number of issues including the level of guaranteed affordable housing, but was granted in September 2021 after amended proposals were submitted.

In March 2020, a bid was made to the Restoring Your Railway Fund to get funds for a feasibility study into reinstating the line from Wolverhampton to Ironbridge. In March 2021 a bid was made to the Restoring Your Railway fund for money to strengthen and develop the case for plans to reinstate the former Ironbridge to Bridgnorth line. Both bids were unsuccessful.

During 2021 part of the former railway line at the site was recommissioned and buildings, platform and other infrastructure features were installed to act as a marketing facility for the Revolution Very Light Rail (RVLR) Demonstrator vehicle announced in October 2021.
