= Ironbridge power stations =

Two former power stations in Shropshire, England

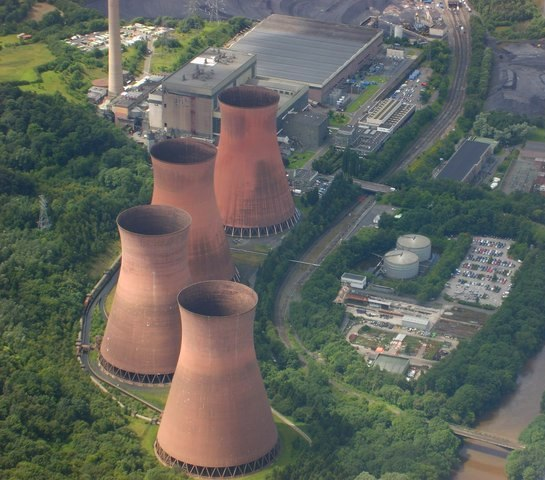
- B Power Station in 2007
- Country: England, United Kingdom
- Location: Shropshire, West Midlands
- Coordinates: 52.63005°N 2.511999°W
- Status: Demolished
- Construction began: A station: 1929; B station: 1963
- Commission date: A station: 1932; B station: 1969
- Decommission date: A station: 1981; B station: 2015
- Owner: Harworth Group
- Operator: West Midlands Joint Electricity Authority (1932–1948) British Electricity Authority (1948–1954) Central Electricity Authority (1954–1957) Central Electricity Generating Board (1957–1990) Powergen (1990–2001) E.ON UK (2001–2018)
- Employees: 130 (2015)

Thermal power station
- Primary fuel: Wood Pellet (Biomass)

Power generation
- Nameplate capacity: A station: 200 MW; B station: 1,000 MW

External links
- Website: www.eon-uk.com/generation/ironbridge.aspx
- Commons: Related media on Commons

The Ironbridge power stations (also known as the Buildwas power stations) refers to two power stations that occupied a site on the banks of the River Severn at Buildwas in Shropshire, England. The Ironbridge B Power Station was operated by E.ON UK but the site is now owned by Harworth Group. The station stands near the Ironbridge Gorge World Heritage Site. Originally powered by coal, they were converted to use 100% biomass fuel. Ironbridge B Power Station stopped generating electricity on 20 November 2015, with the decommissioning process continuing into 2017. The main phase of the 27-month demolition process began at 11:00 GMT on 6 December 2019, commencing with the four cooling towers.

== Ironbridge A (1932–1981) ==
=== Site selection ===
Ironbridge was selected to be the site of a large, modern "super station" by the West Midlands Joint Electricity Authority, in February 1927. The land had been identified earlier by Walsall Borough as being suitable for power generation, in 1924. The close proximity of the River Severn and several railway lines provided excellent access to both cooling water and a source for the delivery of coal. The flat land of the site, formed by fluvial processes at the end of the last ice-age, was ideal for the construction of a large turbine hall.

=== Design and specification ===
Ironbridge A Power Station

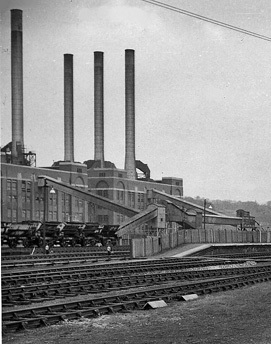
Image taken April 1962

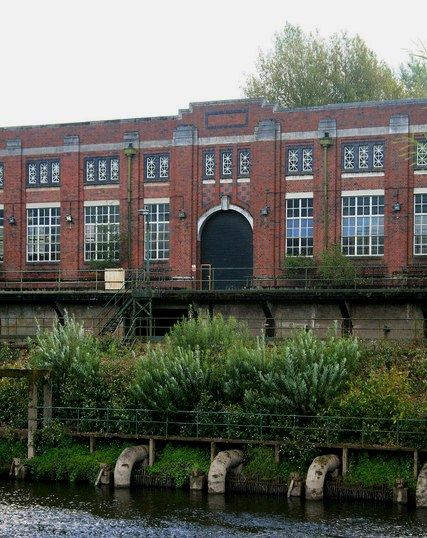
Image taken September 2010

Construction of the first Ironbridge Power Station (later to become known as Ironbridge A Power Station) began in 1929, and the first phase was completed in 1932. The station officially opened on 13 October 1932 initially with a BTH 50,000 kW turbo alternator powered from three Stirling boilers (one being spare) with an evaporative capacity of 225,000 lb. per hour. which at the time were largest yet constructed in Great Britain. The full generating capacity of Ironbridge A was not realised until major expansions and the commissioning of extra boilers and generating sets had been completed in 1939. This gave the A Station a total generating output of 200 megawatts (MW).

The generating capacity and thermal efficiency were as shown in the table.

Ironbridge A
| Year | Electricity supplied, GWh | Thermal efficiency, % |
|---|---|---|
| 1946 | 841.9 | 23.29 |
| 1954 | 667.7 | 22.00 |
| 1955 | 551.5 | 21.75 |
| 1956 | 678.3 | 21.13 |
| 1957 | 463.3 | 20.60 |
| 1958 | 350.5 | 19.29 |
| 1961 | 412.7 | 20.49 |
| 1962 | 383.8 | 20.20 |
| 1963 | 398.7 | 19.38 |
| 1967 | 389.4 | 19.72 |
| 1972 | 299.7 | 19.74 |
| 1979 | 2.1 | – |

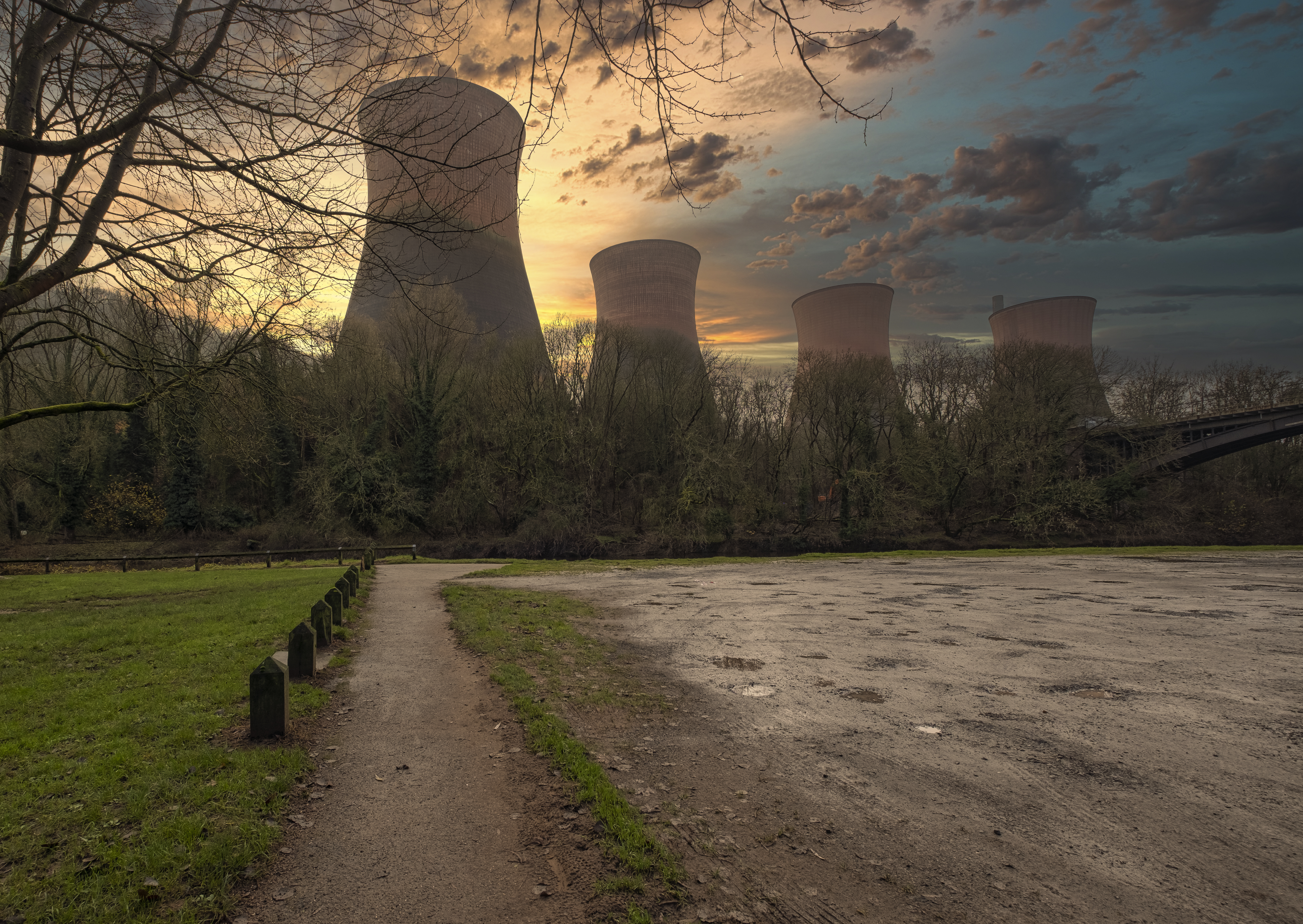
Ironbridge Power Station 2019

As a result of the increasing demand for electricity after World War II, it was decided by the Central Electricity Generating Board that a new, larger, 1,000 MW power station called Ironbridge B, was to be constructed alongside the A station. The A station was partially closed on 27 October 1980, with the decommissioning of 100 MW of the station's generating capacity. The remainder of the station's capacity ceased generating electricity in 1981 and significant portions of the station were demolished in 1983 prior to being granted listed building status.

== Ironbridge B (1969–2015) ==
Parliamentary approval for Ironbridge B Power Station was sought and granted in 1962. Construction began in 1963, with the aim to begin generating electricity in the station in 1967. Due to construction delays, some limited industrial action and the implementation of improvements that had been pioneered during the construction of similar stations using the new 500 MW generating units, Ironbridge B did not begin feeding power into the National Grid until 11 June 1969. Full capacity was not reached until the second 500 MW unit began generating in February 1970. Ironbridge B was considered "less than successful during its first decade of operation" with Unit 1 achieving no better than 420-430MW. Sustained work and substantial investment during the late 1970s and 1980s substantially improved the station's efficiency and reliability. There were 2 × 17.5 MW auxiliary gas turbines on the site, these had been commissioned in August 1967. Ironbridge B Power Station stopped generating electricity on 20 November 2015 when it reached its 20,000 hours limit of generation under a European Union Directive.

=== Design ===
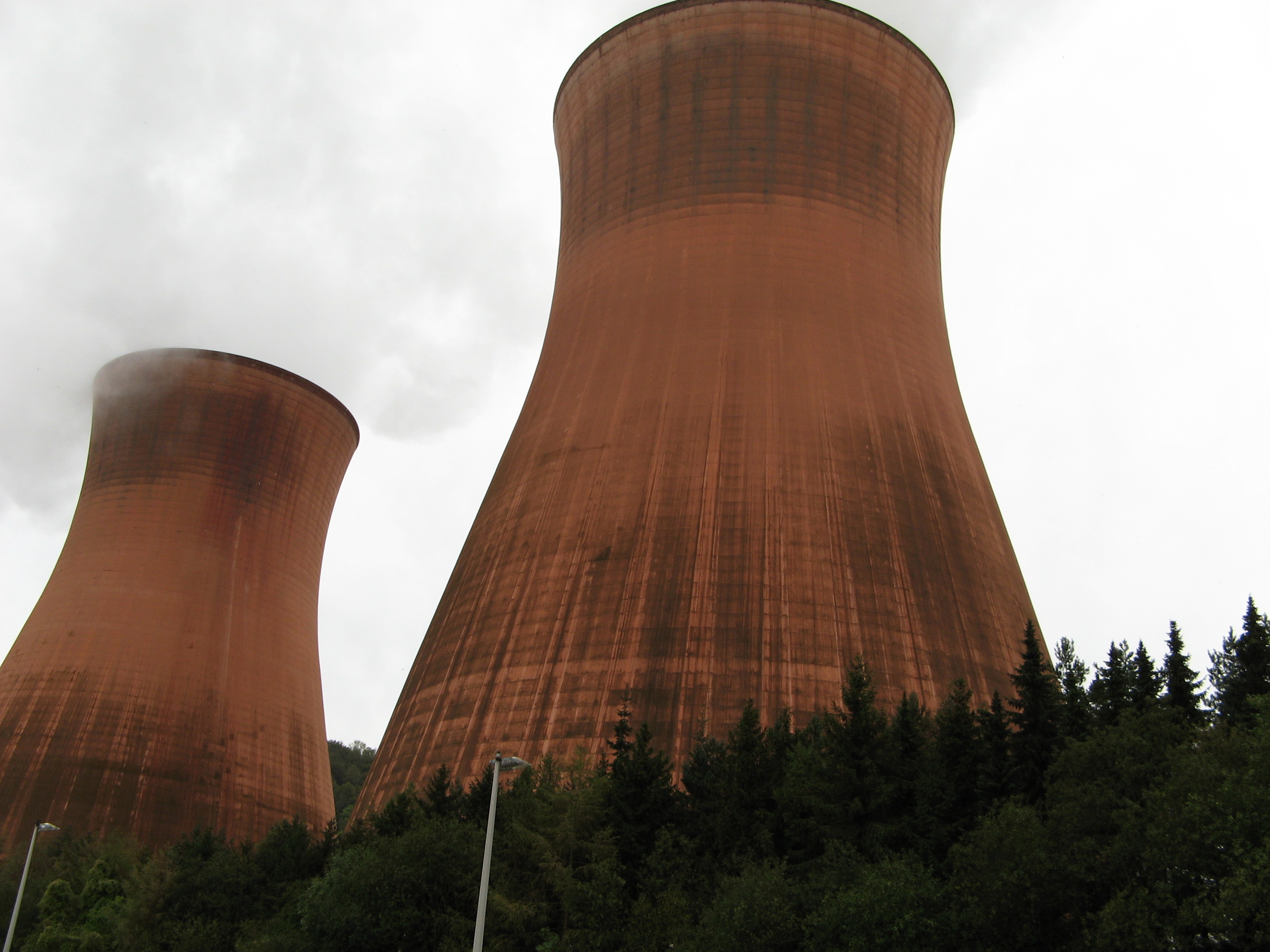
The pink cooling towers of Ironbridge

Project architect Alan Clark worked closely with landscape architect Kenneth Booth, to ensure that the station merged as far as possible into its natural surroundings. In this respect, the power station was unique amongst British coal-fired stations. When viewed from Ironbridge, the surroundings of the station were hidden by wooded hills. The cooling towers were deliberately constructed using concrete to which a red pigment had been added, to blend with the colour of the local soil. This had cost £11,000 in the 1960s. The towers could not be seen at all from the world-famous landmark, The Iron Bridge. The station's single 205 m (673 ft) high chimney was fifth tallest chimney in the UK. It was the tallest structure in Shropshire, as well as being taller than Blackpool Tower and London's BT Tower.

The station's turbine hall was decoratively clad in chipped granite faced concrete panels, aluminium sheeting, and glazing. The turbine hall obscured the rather more functional metal clad boiler house from view. A free-standing administration block continued the theme of concrete panelling, albeit with extensive use of large floor to ceiling windows. Period fittings within the administration block included a board room, containing murals that referenced the industries of the Ironbridge Gorge, and a grand entrance hall with a metallic mural.

So impressive were the measures taken to ensure that the power station was an asset to the gorge and not an eyesore, that it was short listed for a Royal Institution of Chartered Surveyors/The Times conservation award in 1973.

=== Specification ===
When fully operational and using 100% coal as a fuel source the power station generated electricity using two 500 MW generating sets. The turbines' blades were 1 m (3 ft 3 in) long each and when the turbines spun at their usual fixed speed of 3,000 rpm, the outermost tip of the last row of blades travel at approximately 2,000 km/h. The boilers operated on pulverised coal and delivered 844 kg/s of steam at 158.6 bar and 566 °C. In the financial year 1980/1 the station sent out 5,285.937 GWh, the thermal efficiency was 33.13 per cent. The station used low NOx burners and electrostatic precipitators to reduce its environmental impact. The majority of the station's ash waste was sold to the construction industry.

=== Electricity output ===
The generating capacity and thermal efficiency were as shown in the table.

Ironbridge B
| Year | Electricity supplied, GWh | Thermal efficiency, % |
|---|---|---|
| 1972 | 2693.6 | 31.05 |
| 1979 | 4875.0 | 33.19 |
| 1981 | 5286.0 | 33.13 |
| 1982 | 5546.1 | 35.46 |

=== Coal supplies and rail access ===
Until June 2010, approximately 3000 – 6000 tonnes of coal was delivered to the power station every day, via a branch line railway through Madeley, Ironbridge and Coalbrookdale, crossing the River Severn via the Grade II listed Albert Edward Bridge. The railway branch joins the Wolverhampton to Shrewsbury line at Madeley Junction.

Coal was delivered variously by DBS, Freightliner and Fastline. After the trains were emptied, they were usually stabled at Warrington Arpley Yard. From 2014 until closure, an additional three trains per day were worked by GB Railfreight from Liverpool dock with biomass chips, which were the main source of feedstock for the power station by then.

Scheduled passenger services on the branch line were stopped in the 1960s, and so the line was kept open primarily for the transportation of coal to the power station. A steam locomotive-hauled special passenger train, organised by railtour company 'Vintage Trains', visited the branch line on 3 November 2007. The tour was entitled Pannier to Ironbridge, and was hauled by former Great Western Railway 0-6-0 Pannier tank No. 9466, which ran a return trip between Tyseley, near Birmingham, and Ironbridge.

=== Ownership ===
In 1990 the CEGB was split into different companies for privatisation, and Ironbridge Power Station went through a number of ownership transfers before eventually being owned by Powergen. In 2001 Powergen was taken over by E.ON, an energy company based in Germany.

On 10 October 1998, one of the turbines caught fire, resulting in an explosion within the turbine hall. The entire turbine hall required repairs.

The station was the last major generator of electricity in Shropshire. The plant consumed about 1.2 million tonnes of coal and 20,000 tonnes of oil each year, and generated 2,990 GWh of electricity in 2004.

Environmental group Friends of the Earth claimed in 2006 the station was the second worst polluting power station in the United Kingdom per megawatt output. Ironbridge had been opted out of the Large Combustion Plant Directive, which meant the station would only be allowed to operate for up to 20,000 hours after 1 January 2008, and that it must close by 31 December 2015. In 2012 Ironbridge underwent modification to allow both generating units to run on 100% biomass (wooden pellets). This reduced the generating capacity from 500MW per unit to approximately 370MW per unit.

In February 2014 fire damaged Unit 1 turbine and generator in Ironbridge B, and in May E.ON announced that the 370 MW unit would not be repaired, reducing the plant's generation capacity.

=== Decommissioning and future development ===
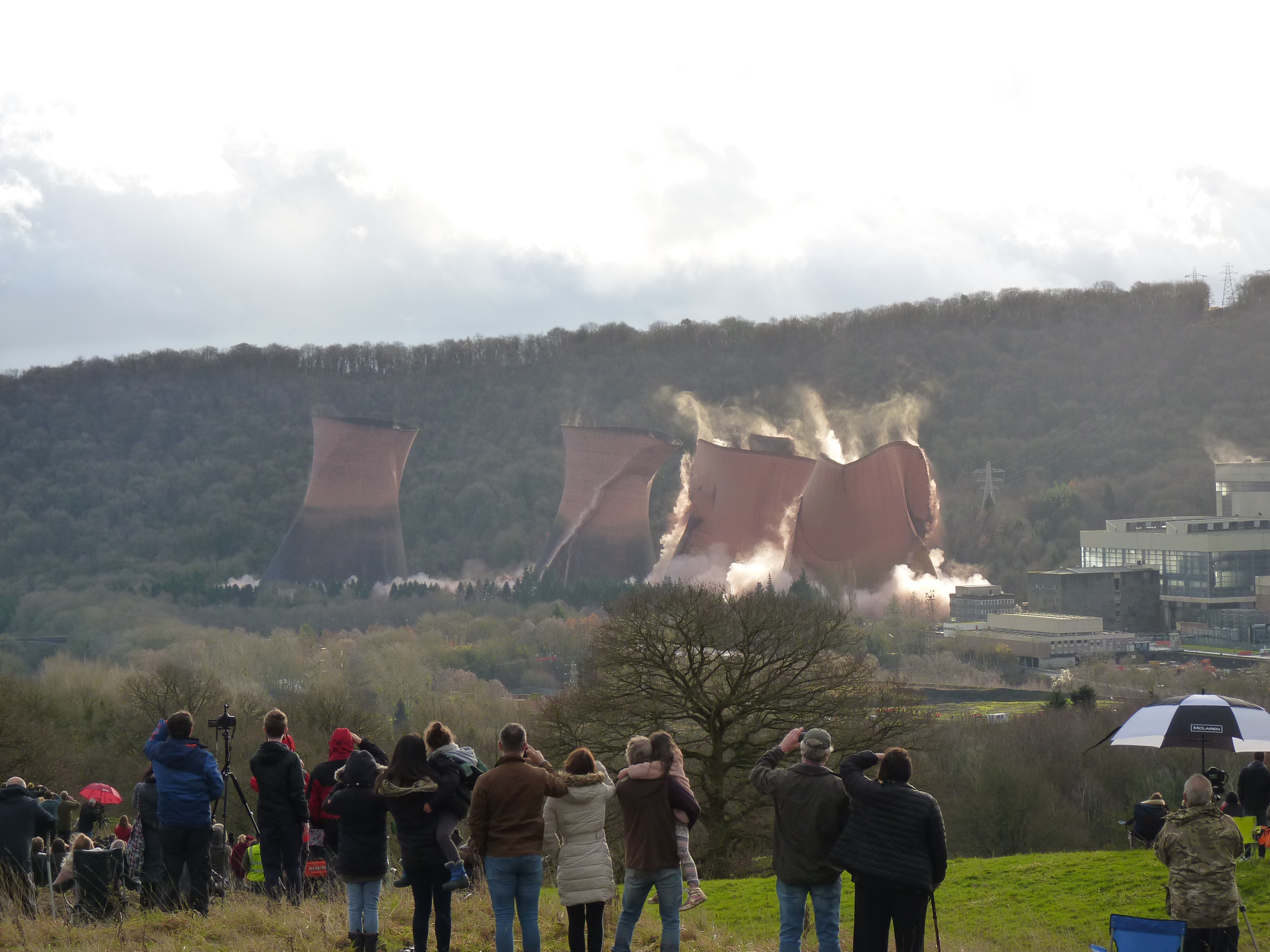
Demolition of Ironbridge B Power Station cooling towers

Following the switch off of Ironbridge B Power Station on 20 November 2015, work began on decommissioning the power station, and was expected to last into 2017. Initial demolition of the site started in July 2017 when the conveyors for the transport of coal and the associated workings were taken down. The rest of the site was to be demolished by the end of 2018 although opinion was divided on whether to demolish or keep the unique 'pink' cooling towers. Locals had sought to save the towers from demolition but English Heritage previously said the towers could not be protected as they do not meet strict criteria. The cooling towers were demolished as planned on Friday 6 December 2019 at 11am. The stations 'Tank Bay' building was demolished on 23 January 2021 at around 11am. The demolition could be heard as far as 3 miles away. The boiler house was demolished on 1 March 2021. The station's chimney was demolished on 3 September 2021. Once fully cleared, the site is to make space for over 1,000 homes, shops and other buildings.

The Telford Steam Railway has aspirations to take over the now disused railway track between the power station and Lightmoor Junction, as part of their southern extension from Horsehay through Doseley. It is unknown how this would interact with trains from the national network should a passenger service be introduced to the new development.

In June 2018, Harworth Group announced that it had bought the Ironbridge power station site for an undisclosed sum. Plans for the site included the development of 'several hundred new homes' together with commercial development, leisure uses and significant public open space. An outline planning application for a development including 1,000 new homes and other facilities was submitted to both Shropshire Council and Telford and Wrekin Council on 19 December 2019. The plan was initially rejected by Shropshire Council's Southern Planning Committee in August 2021 over a number of issues including the level of guaranteed affordable housing, but was granted in September 2021 after amended proposals were submitted.

== See also ==
- List of tallest structures in the United Kingdom
