= Lightmoor Junction =

Railway junction in Shropshire, England

Coordinates: 52.6431°N 2.4706°W

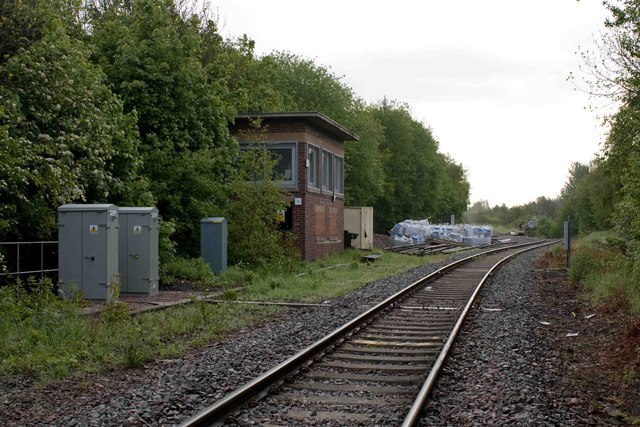
Lightmoor Junction in 2009

Lightmoor Junction was a railway junction between Ironbridge Power Station at Buildwas and Madeley Junction in Shropshire, England.

From Lightmoor Junction, a line ran towards Wellington via Doseley and Horsehay. Following the complete closure of this line in 1981, Lightmoor Junction Signal Box was retained to control the connection between the double-track section towards Ironbridge Power Station and the single-track section towards Madeley Junction. The signal box closed on 23 October 2006, when the line towards Ironbridge Power Station was singled, with new signalling controlled from Madeley Junction Signal Box (since 2011 transferred to West Midlands Signalling Centre).

Telford Steam Railway use a portion of the former line to Wellington, and intend to use the signal box as part of their heritage railway. Negotiations for the lease and occupation of Lightmoor Junction Signal Box were concluded and keys handed over to TSR by Network Rail officials on 8 August 2008.
