= Wellington to Craven Arms Railway =

Railway line in Shropshire, England

The Wellington to Craven Arms Railway was formed by a group of railway companies that eventually joined the Great Western Railway family, and connected Wellington, Shropshire and Shifnal, with Coalbrookdale, Buildwas, Much Wenlock and a junction near Craven Arms. Its objectives were dominated by the iron, colliery and limestone industries around Coalbrookdale.

The route sections that together formed the network were

- the Shrewsbury and Birmingham Railway Coalbrookdale branch from Madeley Junction (near Shifnal) to Lightmoor;
- the Wellington and Severn Junction Railway from Ketley Junction (near Wellington) to Lightmoor;
- the Great Western Railway Coalbrookdale extension from Lightmoor to Coalbrookdale;
- the Wenlock Railway from Coalbrookdale to Buildwas;
- the Much Wenlock and Severn Junction Railway from Buildwas to Much Wenlock;
- the Wenlock Railway from Much Wenlock to Marsh Farm Junction, north of Craven Arms.

The railways were opened in the period from 1854 to 1867. The railways local to Coalbrookdale were heavily used by mineral traffic; the hoped-for trunk hauls to and from South Wales via Craven Arms were not realised. Passenger traffic was never heavy, and was sparse between Much Wenlock and Craven Arms. Passenger traffic closures took place from 1951 and ordinary goods traffic closed down in the 1960s. Ironbridge B Power Station generated significant volumes of merry-go-round coal traffic between 1967 and 2015. The line is now entirely closed to ordinary traffic, but the heritage Telford Steam Railway operates on a section near Doseley.

== Background ==
From the early medieval period, Coalbrookdale was a centre of extraction of coal. The River Severn provided the route for transport to market, and pack horses on primitive roads were also used. As the early part of the Industrial Revolution took place, there was a demand for limestone, a key ingredient of the iron making process, and the iron itself had to be transported away. Wooden railways and plateways had long been used to get access to the river, but the steep-sided valley through which the river ran, and the hilly terrain in general, discouraged canal building, and for a time limited railway access too.

There was considerable industry in the steep-sided valley of the river Severn around Coalbrookdale. From 1709 Abraham Darby the elder established an iron foundry there, leading to a massive increase in technological and industrial output, and the formation later of the Coalbrookdale Company. Transport of raw materials and finished products was difficult, and heavy use was made of the River Severn.

== Shrewsbury and Birmingham Railway ==
When the Shrewsbury and Birmingham Railway planned its line, it was projected to run through Wellington, to the north of Coalbrookdale, avoiding the difficult terrain of the Severn Valley. It was authorised by the Shrewsbury and Birmingham Railway Act 1846 (9 & 10 Vict. c. cccvii) on 3 August 1846, and the authorisation included a 4 1/4 mile branch to Coalbrookdale. Construction proceeded and the Shrewsbury and Birmingham Railway opened its main line in 1849. Many manufacturers transferred their transport to the railway, reaching the industrial districts in the north west of England more conveniently.

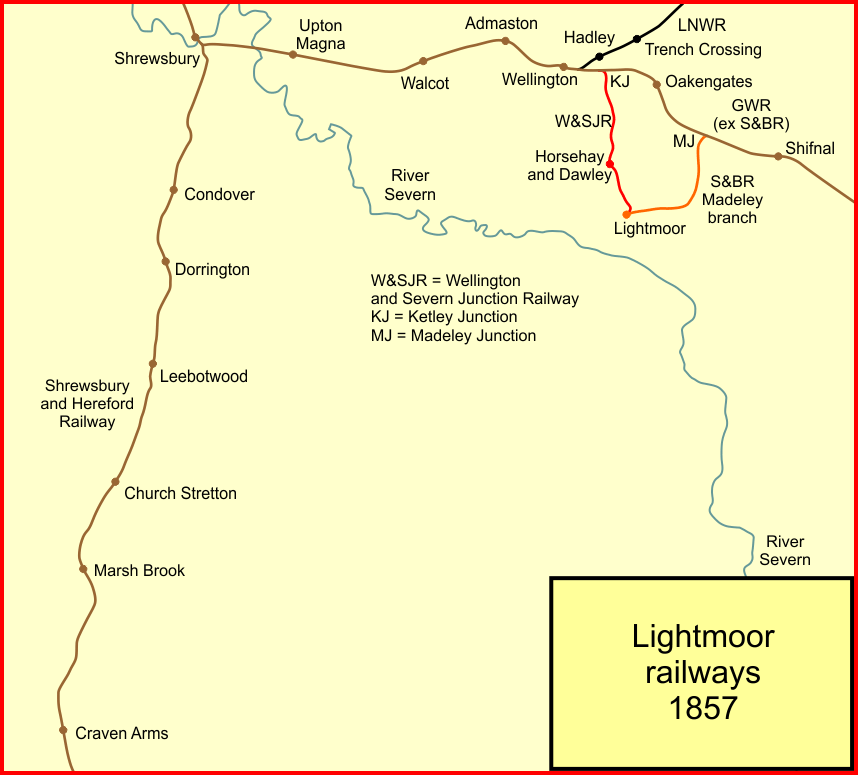
Two branch lines to Lightmoor

The authorised branch line to Coalbrookdale was from near Ketley, a mile east of Wellington. In the 1847 and 1849 sessions of Parliament the S&BR obtained acts of Parliament, the Shrewsbury and Birmingham Railway (Amendment and Branches) Act 1847 (10 & 11 Vict. c. lxxx) and the Shrewsbury and Birmingham Railway Amendment Act 1849 (12 & 13 Vict. c. lxxxv) for a branch line to Madeley from a triangular junction near Shifnal, and an extension from Coalbrookdale to Ironbridge.

Not all of these branches were made. However the Madeley branch was built, and opened in November 1854 (Note: Jones; Tolson says 1 June.) as far as Madeley Court from near Shifnal at what became Madeley Junction. It was extended on 1 October 1855 to Lightmoor, which was a major centre of the metal industry. (Note: The branch is often referred to as the Madeley Branch, but also the GWR Lightmoor Branch. Madeley Junction was the eastern junction of what was to have been the triangular junction, which was never completed in that form.)

== Wellington and Lightmoor ==
John Dickson of the Shropshire Works, Wellington, had furnaces at Ketley, a mile or so south of Wellington, and in February 1851 he had opened a short private line from Waterloo Sidings, at Wellington, to Ketley.

Wellington and Severn Junction Railway Act 1853
- Act of Parliament
- Parliament of the United Kingdom
- Long title: An Act for making a Railway from Wellington to Coalbrookdale, and an Extension to the River Severn, all in the County of Salop; and for other Purposes.
- Citation: 16 & 17 Vict. c. ccxiv

Dates
- Royal assent: 20 August 1853

Text of statute as originally enacted

In October 1852 the Coalbrookdale Company discussed extending Dickson's line to Coalbrookdale, but the cost was considered unaffordable, and a public company was promoted instead: it was to be called the Wellington and Severn Junction Railway. Despite opposition from other railway companies, royal assent was given to the Wellington and Severn Junction Railway Act 1853 (16 & 17 Vict. c. ccxiv) on 20 August 1853. The S&BR gave technical assistance and some financial help. The cost of building the line was estimated at £60,000.

Acquisition of land proved easier than elsewhere, suggesting that landowners saw the railway as an aid to their business interests. The construction focussed on the easier part of the line, but even so progress was slow. A demonstration run on the line from Ketley to Horsehay for shareholders took place on 21 February 1857, and it appears that goods and mineral traffic operated on this section from that time. (Note: Jones, pages 40 and 41. Oppitz page 66 says 14 May 1857.) It opened fully on 1 May 1858. (Note: MacDermot says 1 June 1854.) (Note: Morriss says 1 May 1857, page)

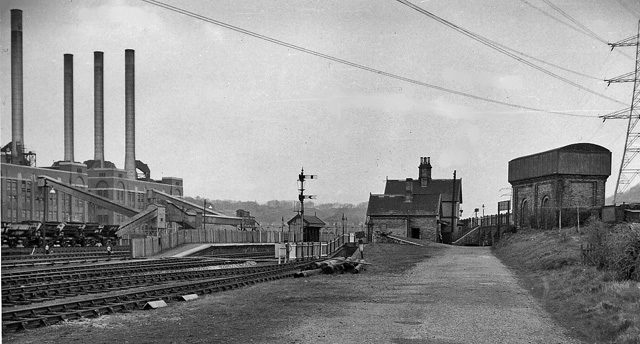
Buildwas railway station

At a shareholders' meeting on 25 March 1858, it was reported that the line was nearly completed into Lightmoor. A junction was to be formed there with the Madeley and Lightmoor branch of the Great Western Railway. (Note: The Shrewsbury and Birmingham Railway had been absorbed by the GWR in 1854.) However the Wellington and Severn Junction Railway could not raise enough money to build on from Lightmoor to Coalbrookdale, and the company decided to leave the completion in abeyance.

The section from Ketley to Horsehay was inspected by Captain Tyler for the Board of Trade on 3 March 1859, but he was scathing about the deficiencies and he declined to approve the line for passenger traffic. A second visit by Captain Ross also disclosed unacceptable features. Hasty rectification was made, and the line was opened for passenger traffic, in fact all the way to Lightmoor, on 2 May 1859. Lightmoor was not a passenger destination in itself, being a centre of the iron industry, so in collaboration with the GWR, the passenger service ran from Wellington to Lightmoor Junction, reversing there, and then on to Shifnal via Madeley over the GWR (former S&BR) branch line.

Some shareholders expressed dissatisfaction that their railway terminated at Lightmoor, but the directors were adamant in declining to undertake to complete the line to Coalbrookdale; there was no possibility at the time of raising the necessary money to do so.

West Midland and Severn Valley Railway Companies Act 1861
- Act of Parliament
- Parliament of the United Kingdom
- Long title: An Act for authorizing the Construction of Railways from the Severn Valley Railway to the West Midland Railway near Kidderminster, and the leasing of the Wellington and Severn Junction Railway by the Great Western and West Midland Railway Companies; and for other Purposes.
- Citation: 24 & 25 Vict. c. ccxii

Dates
- Royal assent: 1 August 1861

The line was worked by the Coalbrookdale Company until 1 July 1861. After that it was leased to the West Midland Railway and the Great Western Railway jointly; the lease was ratified by the West Midland and Severn Valley Railway Companies Act 1861 (24 & 25 Vict. c. ccxii) of 1 August 1861. Following an agreement with the West Midland Railway the Wellington and Severn Junction Railway was operated by them. The WMR amalgamated with the GWR on 1 August 1863, keeping the name Great Western Railway, and the GWR then took over the working arrangement.

== The Much Wenlock and Severn Junction Railway ==
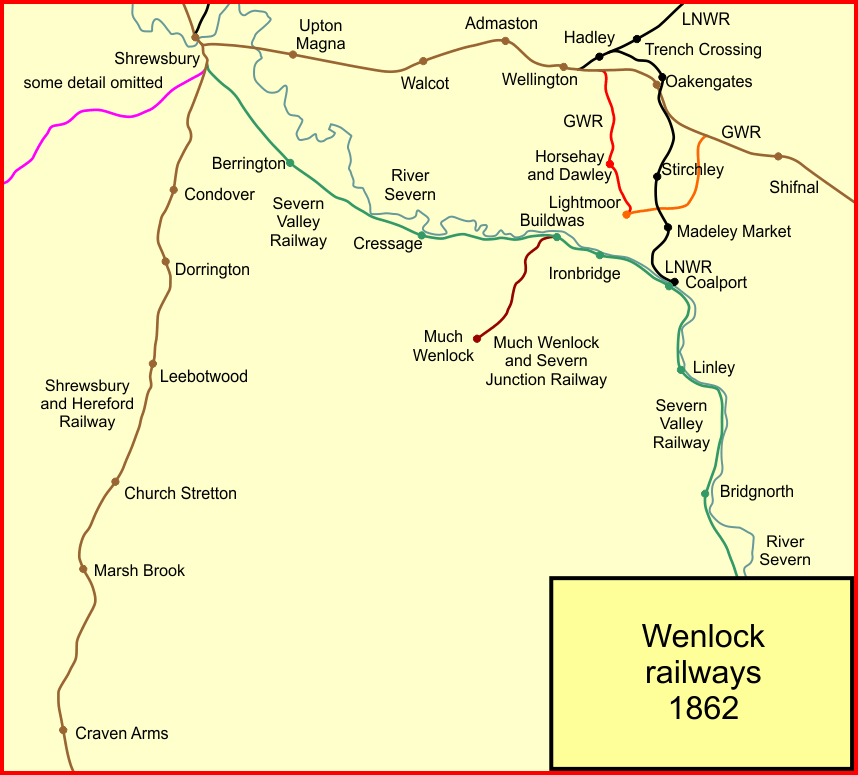
Much Wenlock and other railways in 1862

Interested parties in Much Wenlock also saw the potential of linking their town to the growing railway network. The Severn Valley Railway was authorised on 20 August 1853 and when built would bring a railway line to Buildwas, four miles away. A meeting held in September 1853 was supportive, but it took some years to prepare a definite scheme: it went to Parliament, and on 21 July 1859 royal assent was given to the Much Wenlock and Severn Junction Railway Act 1859 (22 & 23 Vict. c. xxvi) it authorised a railway from Much Wenlock to join the Severn Valley Railway (then under construction) at Buildwas; authorised capital was £24,000.

The appointed contractors were Brassey and Field, and construction began in March 1860. A Board of Trade inspection of the line was carried out by Colonel William Yolland on 31 December 1861. He required a number of changes, but these were swiftly made, and on 30 January 1862 he made a second visit, this time agreeing to the opening.

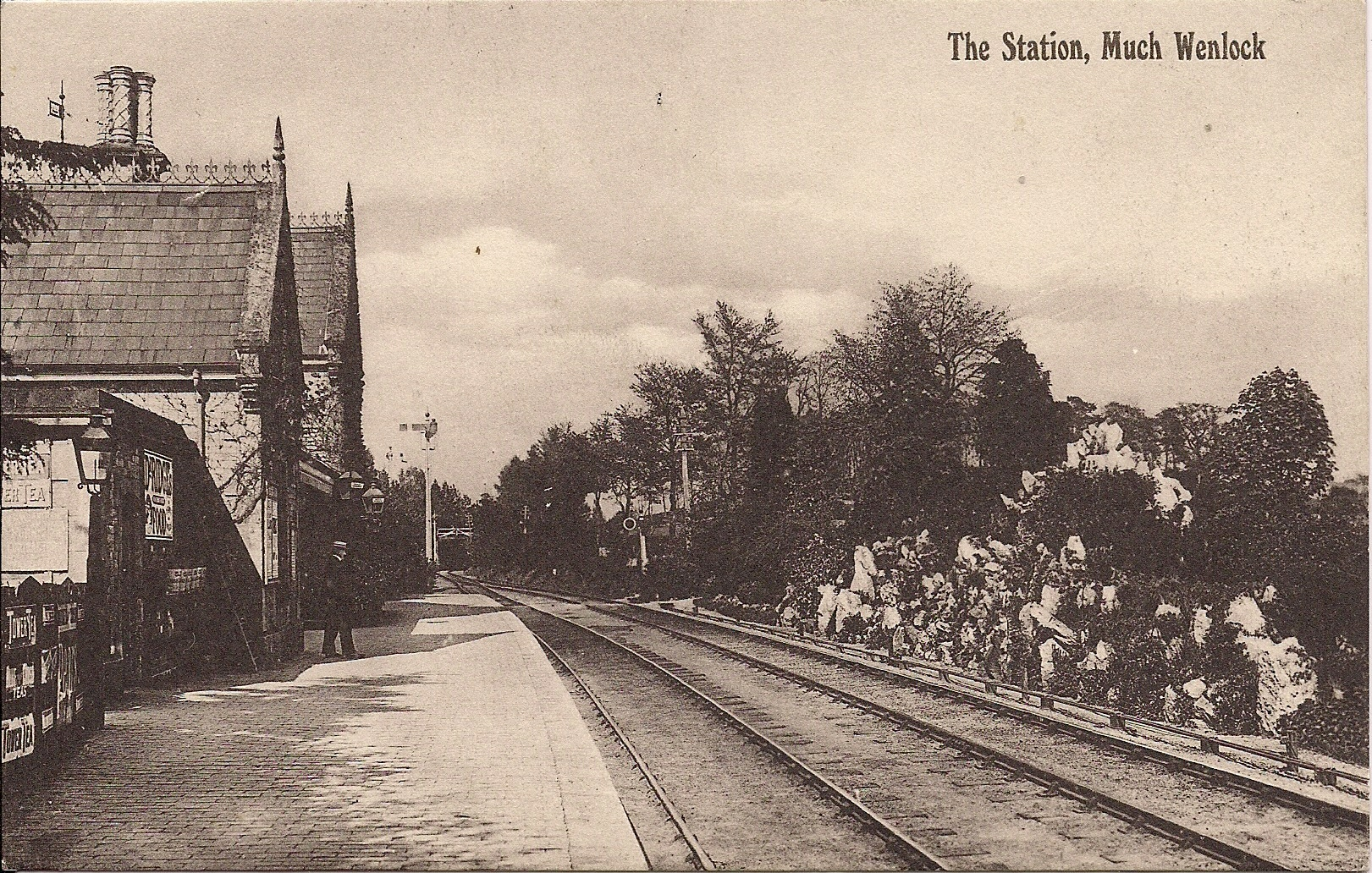
Much Wenlock railway station

The line between Much Wenlock and Buildwas was opened on 1 February 1862 for passenger and goods traffic; the opening day was the same day as the opening of the Severn Valley Railway between Shrewsbury and Hartlebury. The Severn Valley Railway was leased from the outset by the GWR. The Severn Valley Railway's undertaking had been leased to the West Midland Railway from 1 July 1860.

There were three daily trains from Much Wenlock to Shrewsbury, via the Severn Valley Railway, and four in the opposite direction.

== Wenlock Railway ==
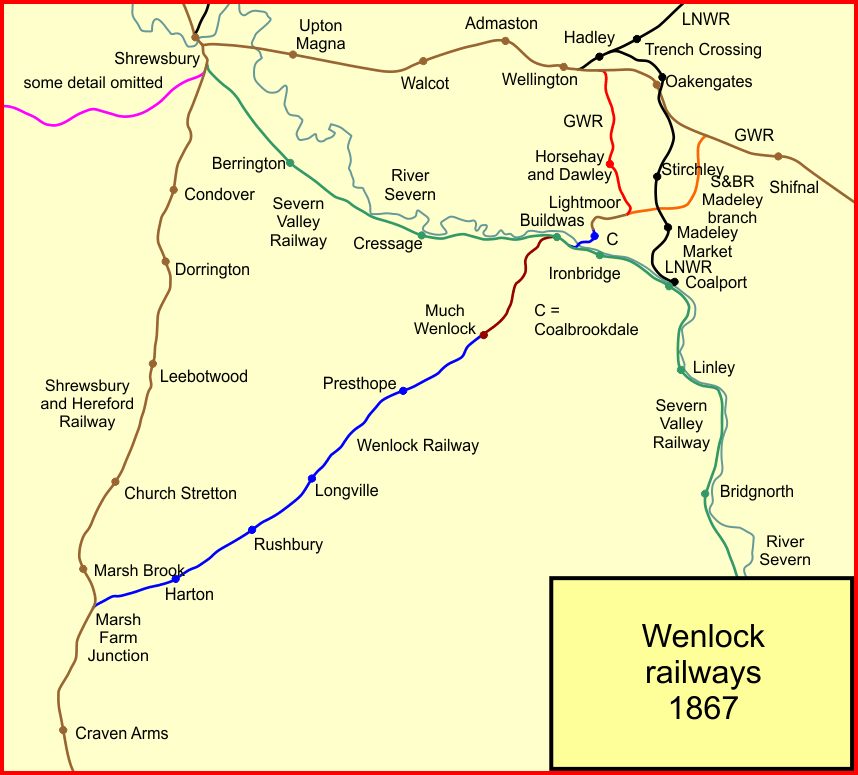
Wenlock to Craven Arms in 1867

The 1859 authorisation of the Wenlock and Severn Junction Railway encouraged more ambitious thoughts, and led to preparation of the Much Wenlock, Craven Arms and Coalbrookdale Railway. Coalbrookdale and its iron industries were only two miles from the line at Buildwas. At the same time the collieries and iron industries of South Wales beckoned. Coal of different qualities was required for mixing as the iron production processes became more sophisticated. A line to Craven Arms would connect with the Shrewsbury and Hereford Railway and through it, the Newport, Abergavenny and Hereford Railway, enabling the desired South Wales to Coalbrookdale connection.

Wenlock Railway Act 1861
- Act of Parliament
- Parliament of the United Kingdom
- Long title: An Act for making Railways from Much Wenlock to the Shrewsbury and Hereford Railway, and a Railway from the Much Wenlock and Severn Junction Railway into Coalbrookdale, with Branches and Works connected therewith; to authorize certain Arrangements with and confer certain Powers upon other Companies; and for other Purposes.
- Citation: 24 & 25 Vict. c. clxxxix

Dates
- Royal assent: 22 July 1861

The project was successful in Parliament and obtained its authorising act of Parliament, the Wenlock Railway Act 1861 (24 & 25 Vict. c. clxxxix) on 22 July 1861 under the title, the 'Wenlock Railway'. It was to build a short extension line from the Severn Valley Railway at Buildwas up to Coalbrookdale, and a much longer line from Much Wenlock towards Craven Arms, making a junction with the Shrewsbury and Hereford Railway at Marsh Farm, three miles north of Craven Arms. Capital was £125,000. Brassey and Field were appointed contractors for the construction of both, having tendered £81,000 for the line between Much Wenlock and Craven Arms and £28,000 for the Coalbrookdale extension, excluding land, stations, sidings and signalling in each case.

== Wenlock Railway: Buildwas to Coalbrookdale ==
The Coalbrookdale extension was planned collaboratively with the Much Wenlock and Severn Valley Junction Railway, and that company contributed £10,000 as a subscription, in view of its obvious interest in having the connecting railway made. The GWR too agreed to assist with the works, as the West Midland Railway, at this time (1861) not yet a friend of the GWR, had been planning a rival connection from Buildwas to Coalbrookdale.

The Wenlock Railway Act 1861 gave the company powers from a junction with the Wenlock and Severn Junction Railway at Buildwas across the River Severn to the lower works of the Coalbrookdale Company.

Wenlock Railway Companies Act 1864
- Act of Parliament
- Parliament of the United Kingdom
- Long title: An Act for authorizing certain Arrangements between the Much Wenlock and Severn Junction Railway Company and Wenlock Railway Company and the Great Western Railway Company; and for extending the Time for the compulsory Purchase of Property required for the Wenlock Railway; and for other Purposes.
- Citation: 27 & 28 Vict. c. cccii

Dates
- Royal assent: 29 July 1864

Text of statute as originally enacted

The Wenlock Railway Companies Act 1864 (27 & 28 Vict. c. cccii) set out the arrangements for the GWR to operate the Coalbrookdale extension. The estimated cost of building the extension was to be £40,000, of which the Wellington and Severn Junction Railway would subscribe £10,000, the Wenlock Railway £10,000, and the GWR £20,000. The line opened on 1 November 1864.

The major engineering work on the extension was the Albert Edward Bridge over the River Severn.

== GWR: linking Lightmoor and Coalbrookdale ==
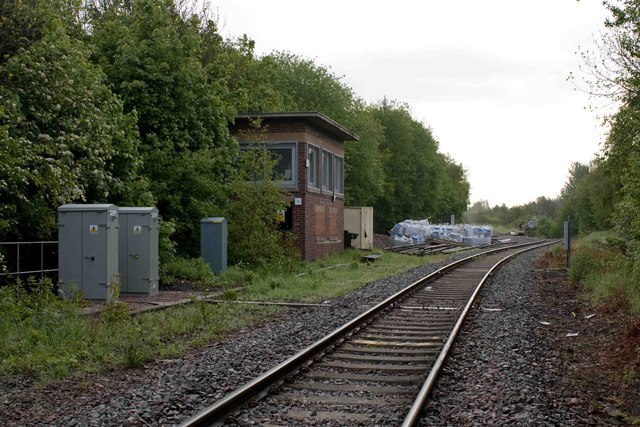
Lightmoor Junction

The Shrewsbury and Birmingham Railway had been absorbed by the Great Western Railway on 1 September 1854, so that the main line at Wellington, and the Madeley branch to Lightmoor were part of that company. The GWR had a bill in Parliament in the same session as the Wenlock Railway's bill. It was to authorise the GWR to build from Lightmoor to Coalbrookdale, reaching that place from the north while the Wenlock scheme would approach from the south.

Great Western Railway (Lightmoor to Coalbrookdale, &c.) Act 1861
- Act of Parliament
- Parliament of the United Kingdom
- Long title: An Act for enabling the Great Western Railway Company to make and maintain a Railway from Lightmoor to Coalbrookdale; and for other Purposes.
- Citation: 24 & 25 Vict. c. cciv

Dates
- Royal assent: 1 August 1861

The Great Western Railway (Lightmoor to Coalbrookdale, &c.) Act 1861 (24 & 25 Vict. c. cciv) was passed on 1 August 1861. Although it was a short line at just over 1 1/2 miles, it was exceptionally expensive due to the difficult terrain: this was why the S&BR had stopped short of building it a decade earlier. Construction was completed by Brassey and Field concurrently with the Wenlock Railway's Coalbrookdale extension. The line opened to traffic on 1 November 1864, having cost £70,000.

The GWR closed Lightmoor station on the day of opening of the extension.

== The Wenlock Railway: Much Wenlock to Craven Arms ==
The Craven Arms section of the Wenlock Railway was a much tougher construction task. Five years were planned for the work. Local opposition forced the company to alter its intended route south of Wenlock Edge to an alignment further north; this involved a tunnel through the Edge west of Presthope.

The objective was a junction with the Shrewsbury and Hereford Railway; it had been leased to the LNWR and the GWR jointly in 1862. The work progressed, and the section from Much Wenlock to Presthope was opened for goods and mineral traffic on 5 December 1864, enabling limestone from Wenlock Edge to be brought to Coalbrookdale. The company was unable to raise further money, and decided on 4 December 1863 not to proceed with the line onward to Craven Arms for the time being.

In 1865 the GWR agreed to make an annual payment of £5,000 to the Wenlock Railway as a commuted payment for working the line between Wenlock and Presthope, and this cash inflow enabled the Wenlock Railway to resume construction. By the end of September 1867 the line on to Marsh Farm was thought to be ready, but Colonel Rich for the Board of Trade condemned the rail chairs of 21 lb. and 22 lb., saying they were too light and had to be replaced by 30 lb. chairs. This decision meant that the whole of the track between Presthope and Marsh Farm Junction had to be taken up and relaid at an extra cost of £2,244. On 9 December 1867 Colonel Rich approved of the line, and the entire line from Buildwas to Marsh Farm Junction was opened to passenger traffic on 16 December 1867.

The journey time from Wellington to Craven Arms was 90 minutes for 28 miles.

== Acrimony between the Wenlock Railway and the GWR ==
The relationship between the Wenlock companies and the GWR was not smooth; the small companies resented the large proportion of income – 42.5% – that the GWR was retaining for working the line, and there were many detail issues that became contentious. In 1861 the London and North Western Railway had opened its Coalport branch line, and the possibility arose of connecting the Wenlock lines to it, by-passing the GWR. In 1872 plans were prepared for a line from Lightmoor to the LNWR line near Madeley Court; incidentally the line would also link in furnaces at Stirchley, Hinkshay and Blists Hill.

Much Wenlock and Severn Junction Railway (Lightmoor Extensions) Act 1873
- Act of Parliament
- Parliament of the United Kingdom
- Long title: An Act for conferring powers upon the Much Wenlock and Severn Junction Railway Company for the construction of Works and the raising of money, and otherwise in relation to their own Undertaking and the Undertakings of other Companies; and for other purposes.
- Citation: 36 & 37 Vict. c. clxxxiii

Dates
- Royal assent: 21 July 1873

Text of statute as originally enacted

The scheme, called the Much Wenlock and Severn Junction Railway (Lightmoor Extensions) Act 1873 (36 & 37 Vict. c. clxxxiii), got royal assent on 21 July 1873. There were to be northwards and southwards junctions with the LNWR line. The Wenlock companies had relied on the Coalbrookdale Company subscribing a substantial sum to the construction, but now that company said that the downturn in the Shropshire iron trade meant that they could not do so. There was now no possibility of making the new line.

A railway No. 1, four furlongs three chains and fifty decimals of a chain in length, commencing in the parish of Madeley by a junction with the Great Western Railway (Lightmoor to Coalbrookdale Branch) near Lightmoor, and terminating in the said parish of Madeley in a pasture field called Near Moors, numbered 201 on the tithe map of the said parish:

A railway No. 2, in the deposited plans, sections, and books of reference referred to as railway No. 3, seven furlongs three chains and fifty-four decimals of a chain in length, commencing in the said parish of Madeley by a junction with the said intended railway No. 1 in a pasture field called Near Moors, numbered 201 on the tithe map of the said parish, and terminating in the parish of Stirchley by a junction with the Coalport Branch of the London and North-western Railway. — Section 4, Much Wenlock and Severn Junction Railway (Lightmoor Extensions) Act 1873 (36 & 37 Vict. c. clxxxiii)

== Absorbed by the Great Western Railway ==
Small railway companies reliant on a dominant partner often found that continued independence was not worthwhile. The Wellington and Severn Junction Railway had long been leased to the Great Western Railway, so that the smaller company was simply a financial entity. In July 1892 it agreed terms with the GWR and was absorbed by it.

This left the Wenlock companies in an uneasy relationship with the GWR. In December 1887 the GWR made new proposals for the payments it would make for working the line, but the smaller companies stalled. In fact the working agreement with the GWR expired at the end of June 1893, but by the end of December 1893 agreement had still not been reached, and the GWR stated that it was not prepared to continue to work the line on the present terms. The GWR offered terms for purchasing the companies, but these were refused. In frustration the GWR threatened to cease working the line. The Wenlock companies now accepted the GWR terms; the takeover was effective from October 1896.

== Introduction of railmotors ==
The Great Western Railway introduced railmotors from 1904; these were self-contained carriages with an integrated small steam engine. Generally they had power-operated steps enabling passenger calls to be made at stopping places without elevated platforms. They were considered ideal for lightly-trafficked lines. From 1 May 1906 they were brought into the passenger services on the Wellington to Craven Arms and Shifnal network. Their ability to reverse direction without the necessity for the locomotive to run round was an advantage, and some of the Wellington services ran via Shifnal, reversing there to run via Madeley. The railmotors' weakness was the small passenger capacity; on the steeply graded routes they were unable to haul a trailer, and they were considered unsuccessful on the Wenlock lines, and in 1906 they were taken off.

== Madeley branch passenger closure ==
The Madeley branch from Shifnal to Lightmoor had always been very sparsely used, and the passenger train service was correspondingly thin. The service was withdrawn on 23 March 23, 1915, but reintroduced for a short period from 13 July 1925 to 21 September 21, 1925.

== Ironbridge power station ==
On 13 October 1932 an electricity generating station was inaugurated at Ironbridge. This brought considerable volumes of coal traffic to the branch. The power station was designed to burn slack coal.

== GWR diesel railcars ==
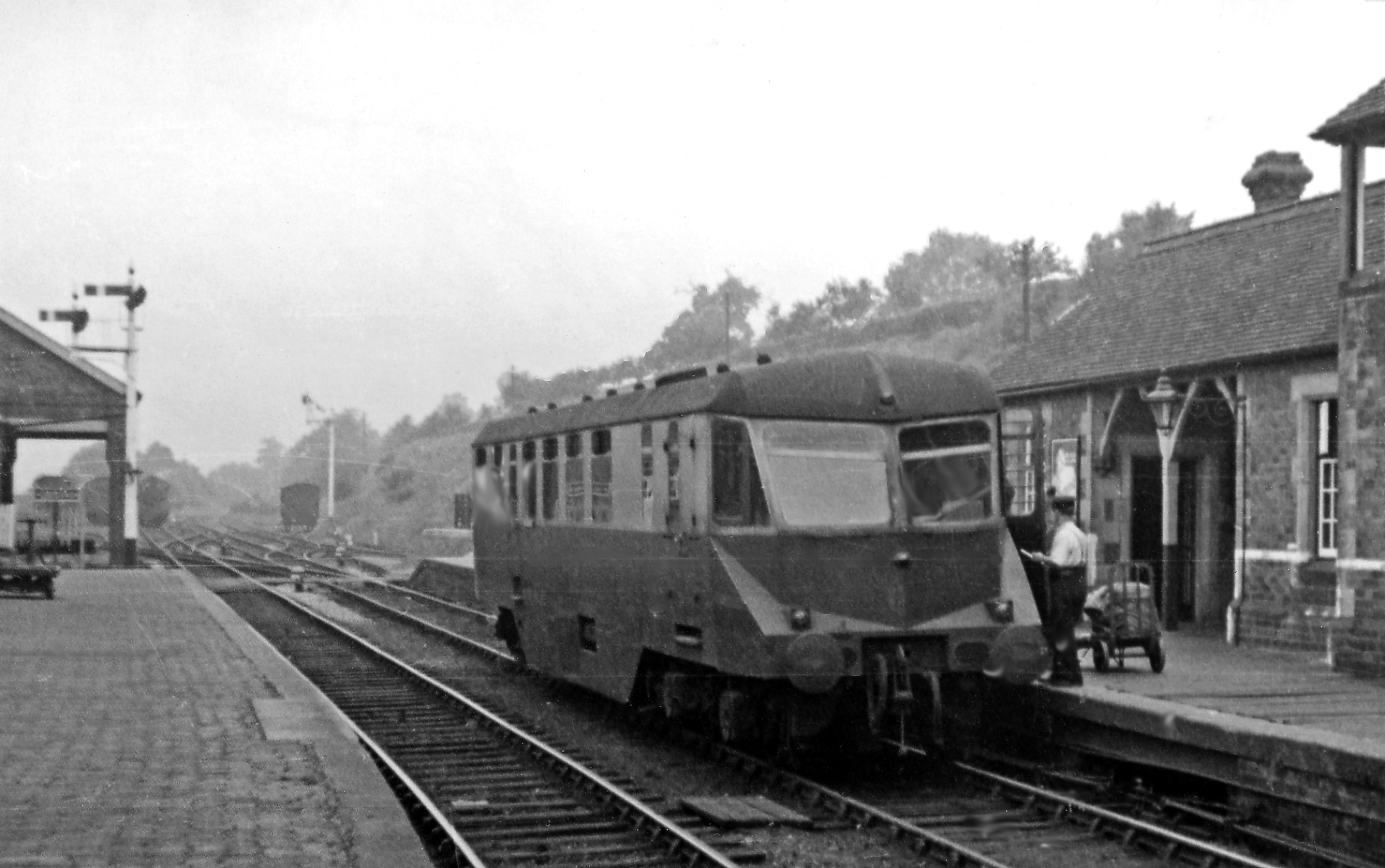
A diesel railcar at Tenbury Wells

In 1937 trials were carried out with one of the GWR's A.E.C. diesel railcars. However the trial was unsuccessful because of the severity of the gradients and, in addition, the inability of the earlier cars to haul a trailer if traffic demanded it.

== Decline ==
Following the end of World War II, there was a steep decline in passenger business between Much Wenlock and Craven Arms, and the decision was taken to close the service; it ceased on 31 December 1951.

A seven-mile stub from Marsh Farm Junction was retained for wagon storage purposes, but in December 1955 it was cut back to a half-mile section at Marsh Farm Junction end, used for parking the Royal Train overnight during visits of the Royal Family to the area.

The passenger service from Wellington to Much Wenlock closed to passengers on 23 July 1962. and concurrently the line between Ketley Junction and Ketley station was closed completely, Ketley and Much Wenlock being serviced via Madeley.

On 4 December 1963 the freight working between Much Wenlock and Longville was withdrawn; on 19 January 1964 goods working between Buildwas and Much Wenlock also ceased; and finally on 6 July 1964 all freight working ceased between Lightmoor Junction and Ketley.

== Power station traffic ==
Ironbridge B Power Station was inaugurated in 1967. The 1932 installation, now designated Ironbridge A, was decommissioned in 1981. The section of line between Madeley Jn and Buildwas via Lightmoor carried merry-go-round coal trains feeding the power stations, and the usage was considerable, but Ironbridge B has now been decommissioned, from 2015. At present (2019) there is no ordinary revenue traffic.

== Heritage railway ==
The Telford Steam Railway operates as a heritage railway over a short length of the line between Lawley Bank and Horsehay & Dawley.

== Location list ==
- Ketley Junction; divergence from Wellington to Oakengates section of main line;
- Start of Wellington and Severn Junction Railway;
- Ketley; opened 2 May 1859; closed 23 July 1962;
- Ketley Town Halt; opened 6 March 1936; closed 23 July 1962;
- New Dale Halt; opened 29 January 1934; closed 23 July 1962;
- Lawley Bank; opened 2 May 1859; closed 23 July 1962;
- Horsehay and Dawley; opened 2 May 1859; closed 23 July 1962;
- Doseley Halt; opened 1 December 1932; closed 23 July 1962;
- Lightmoor Junction; convergence of S&BR Madeley branch;
- Lightmoor; opened 2 May 1859; closed 1 November 1864;
- Start of GWR Coalbrookdale Extension;
- Lightmoor Platform; opened 12 August 1907; closed 1 January 1917; reopened 23 June 1919; closed 23 July 1962;
- Green Bank Halt; opened 12 March 1934; closed 23 July 1962;
- Start of Wenlock Railway;
- Telford Coalbrookdale; opened 27 May 1979; closed 3 September 1979
- Coalbrookdale; opened 1 November 1864; closed 23 July 1962;
- Buildwas; opened 1 February 1862; closed 9 September 1963; Severn Valley Railway station;
- Start of Much Wenlock and Severn Junction Railway
- Farley Halt; opened 24 October 1934; closed 23 July 1962;
- Much Wenlock; opened 1 February 1862; closed 23 July 1962;
- Start of Wenlock Railway;
- Stretton Westwood Crossing Halt; opened 1933 for quarrymen; renamed Westwood Halt and opened for general use 7 December 1935; closed 31 December 1951;
- Presthope; opened 16 December 1867; closed 31 December 1951;
- Easthope Halt; opened 4 April 1936; closed 31 December 1951;
- Longville; opened 16 December 1867; closed 31 December 1951;
- Rushbury; opened 16 December 1867; closed 31 December 1951;
- Harton; opened 16 December 1867; renamed Harton Road 1881; closed 31 December 1951;
- Marsh Farm Junction; convergence with Shrewsbury and Hereford Railway.

=== Madeley Branch (GWR) ===
- Madeley Junction; divergence from Shifnal to Wellington section of main line;
- Madeley Court; opened 2 May 1859; renamed Madeley 1897; closed 22 March 1915; reopened 13 July 1925; closed 21 September 1925;
- Lightmoor Junction; (above).

== Albert Edward Bridge ==
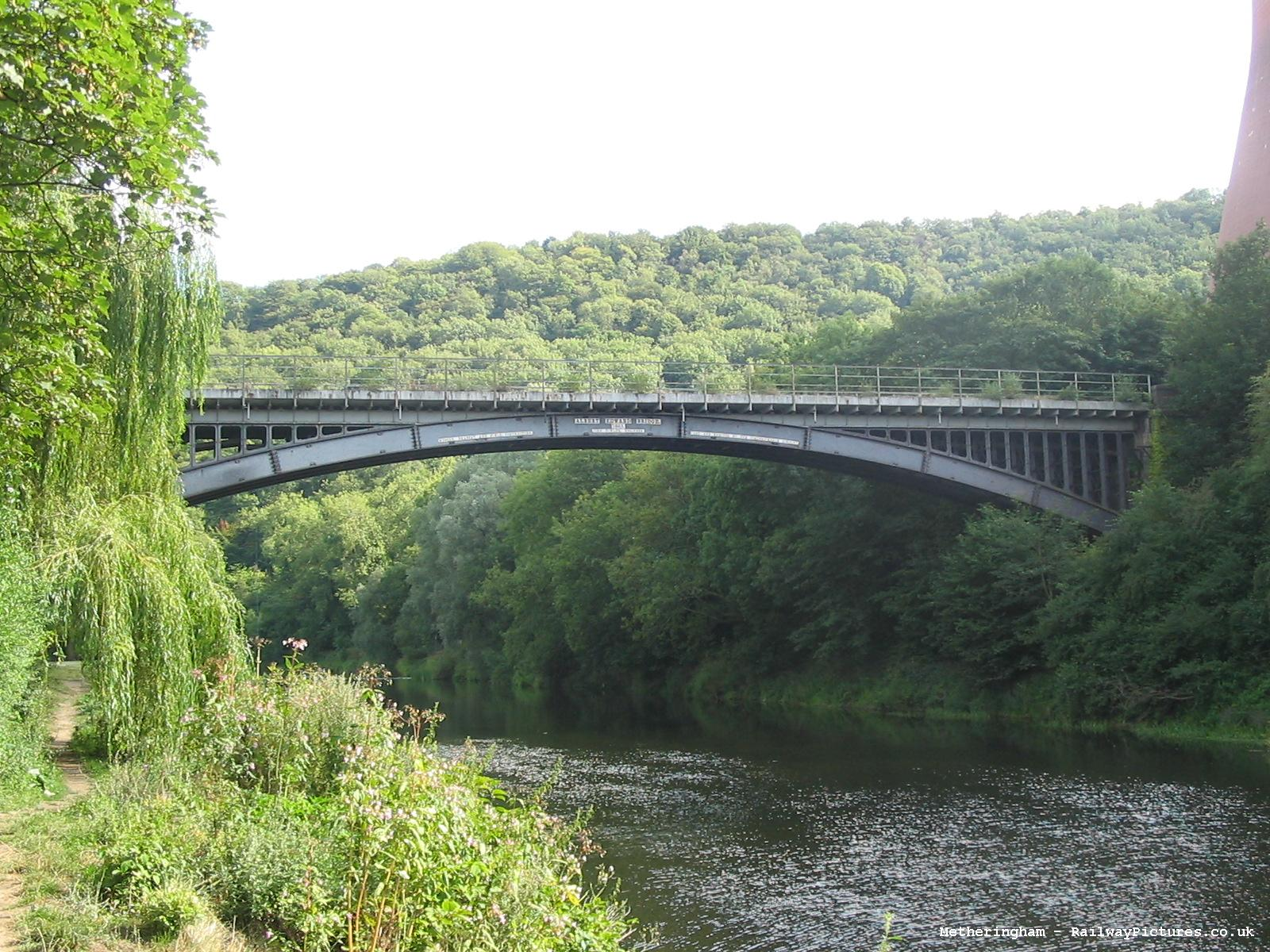
Albert Edward Bridge

The Institution of Civil Engineers Panel for Historical Engineering Works published the following in 1986:

Opened on 1 November 1864, the Albert Edward Bridge carries the double line of the Wenlock Railway... over the River Severn. It is similar to the Victoria Bridge near Arley... and like it was designed by Sir John Fowler and cast by the Coalbrookdale Company. The four iron ribs are in nine sections bolted together and spring from brick abutments. The decking is supported from the arch by cast iron verticals heavily cross-braced. The original wrought iron and timber decking was replaced in 1933 by steel beams and plates, supporting ballasted track. This is thought to be one of the last, if not the last, major cast iron railway bridges to have been built and is still in use today, carrying the daily coal supply to the Ironbridge Electricity Generating Station nearby.
