= Horsehay =

Village in Shropshire, England

Coordinates: 52.656°N 2.490°W

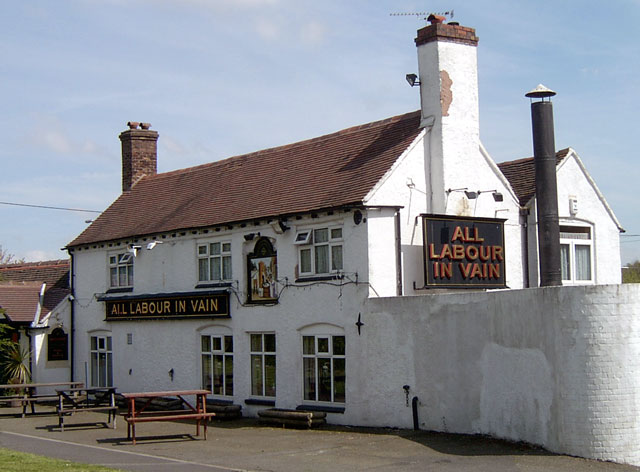
- The All Labour in Vain public house, Horsehay

- Location within Shropshire
- Population: 4,292 (2011)
- OS grid reference: SJ675075
- Civil parish: Dawley Hamlets
- Unitary authority: Telford and Wrekin
- Ceremonial county: Shropshire
- Region: West Midlands
- Country: England
- Sovereign state: United Kingdom
- Post town: Telford
- Postcode district: TF4
- Dialling code: 01952
- Police: West Mercia
- Fire: Shropshire
- Ambulance: West Midlands
- UK Parliament: Telford

Horsehay is a suburban village on the western outskirts of Dawley in the Telford and Wrekin borough of Shropshire, England. Horsehay lies in the Dawley Hamlets parish, and on the northern edge of the Ironbridge Gorge area.

Horsehay used to have four pubs, The Station Inn, The Forester Arms, the All Labour In Vain and the Travellers Joy, however The Station Inn closed down in 2012, and the All Labour In Vain closed in 2014. It also has a Methodist Chapel, a village hall, a post office, and a golf course complete with restaurant.

== Etymology ==
The rough meaning of its name is 'an enclosure for horses', as hay is usually added to place names to indicate an enclosure of some sort. The origin of the name dates back to no earlier then 1759. and as late as 1981 it was reportedly pronounced "Ossay" in local dialect.

== History ==
Originally Horsehay was nothing more than a farm, until the 1750s when Abraham Darby II built a blast furnace next to what is now known as Horsehay Pool. The Coalbrookdale Company further developed the area, constructing brickworks and later a pottery in 1838. Coalbrookdale specialised in the smaller and more decorative ironwork pieces, whereas Horsehay produced many larger scale products, including the railway bridge in nearby Shifnal. As the iron trade in the area began to slump, in 1857 the railway arrived. Horsehay is still home to the Telford Steam Railway to this day. A.B. Cranes bought the site previously occupied by the ironworks to manufacture some of the largest cranes in Europe until it closed down in 1983. The site has been transformed into both a small factory estate and a housing estate. The houses which were kept for the ironworks employees were clustered around Horsehay Pool in Spring Village, and they are still lived in today.

Horsehay and Spring Village conservation area, also referred to as Horsehay conservation area, was designated in 1999.

=== Horsehay Works ===
Horsehay works has a history of more than 230 years on the same site. Formed in 1755 by Abraham Darby II it contributed to the birth of the Industrial Revolution through large scale production of iron. Later it produced pre-fabricated bridges for export all over the world. It was a major employer in the area until the mid-1980s when it closed under the ownership of Adamson Alliance.

The following is based on an article "Horsehay Works (1755–1986) - a history of a once dominating company" by J. L. Woolley (local artist and former employee of Horsehay Works):

Abraham Darby I, a Quaker, succeeded in smelting iron with coke as a fuel suitable for forges in 1709. The Coalbrookdale Company needed additional furnaces and Horsehay (an easy walk to the north) provided a sufficient water supply and land for lease. In addition, Dawley (adjacent to the east) provided mines. The furnace at Horsehay came into blast successfully on 5 May 1755. For this venture, Darby II enlisted the financial help of Thomas Goldney III (the main shareholder of the Coalbrookdale Company).

The new furnace ushered in a period of great activity when the East Shropshire Coalfield, for a time, became the area of greatest production of iron then known. Such was the importance of the furnace that many people including dignitaries visited it.

A railway from Horsehay to the nearby Severn wharves was built and the first waggon of 'pigs' (iron) was sent down Jiggers bank through Coalbrookdale and on to the wharves almost within sight of the Ironbridge (built later by Abraham Darby III, completed in 1779).

== Telford Horsehay Steam Trust ==
Horsehay is home to the Telford Steam Railway. It holds various events throughout the year, including as of 2017, a 1940s weekend and a Polar Express experience at Christmas.

== Famous residents ==
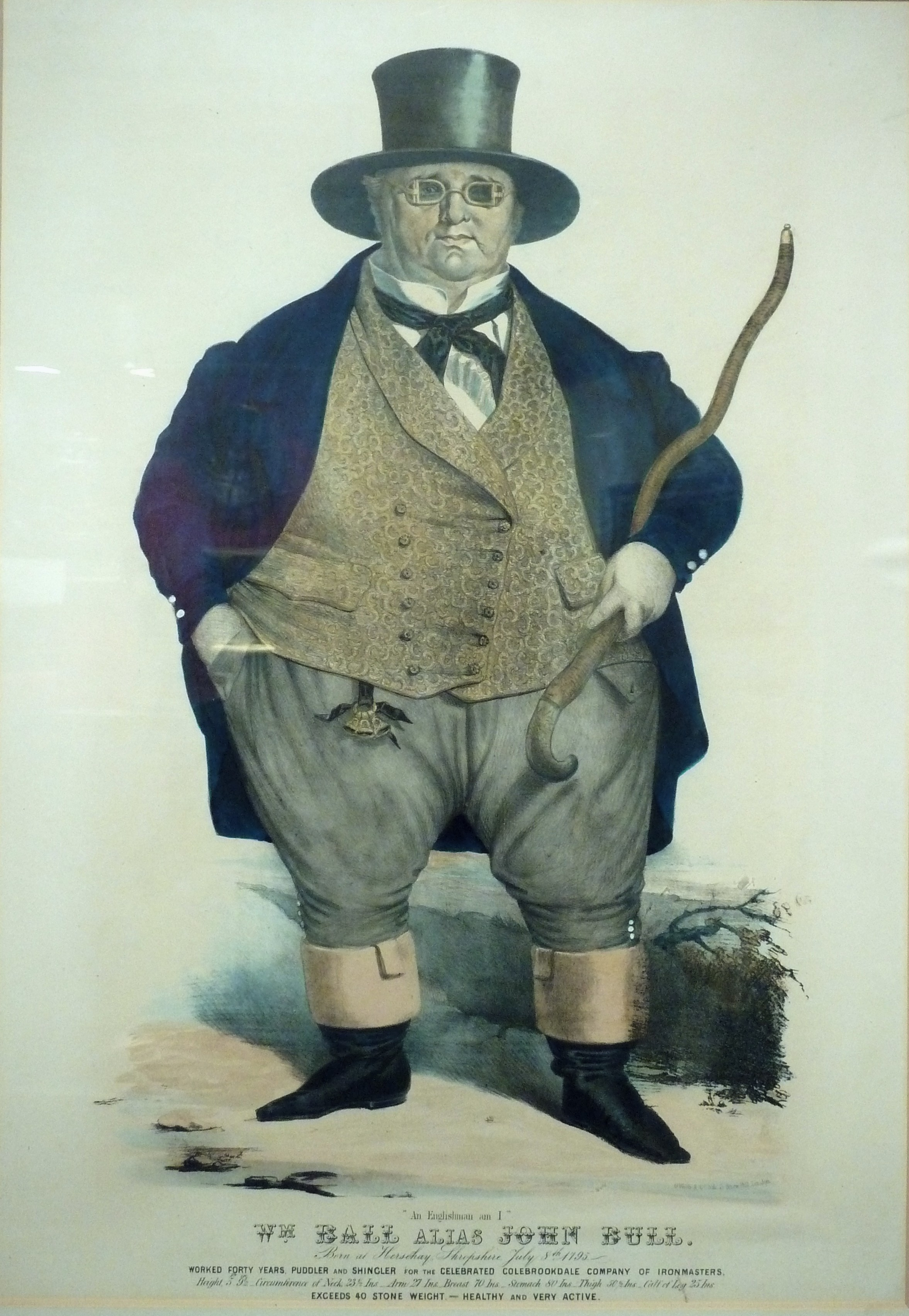
William Ball

Horsehay was the birthplace in 1913 of novelist Edith Pargeter, who wrote the popular Brother Cadfael novels under the pen name "Ellis Peters". Country singer/songwriter, Raymond Froggatt lived there until his death in 2023 and had his studio in the village. Television personality Paul Hendy used to live in one of the cottages round Horsehay Pool.

Back in the early 19th century, a giant of a man called William Ball worked in the Horsehay Iron Works. At the time, he was the heaviest man in England, tipping the scales at 36 Stones. Following an eye injury, he finished work at the Iron Works and toured the country under the name of "John Bull".

== See also ==
- Listed buildings in Dawley Hamlets
