= Newdale =

Newdale may refer to:

- Newdale, Idaho
- Newdale, Manitoba, a community in Municipality of Harrison Park
- Newdale, Shropshire, part of Telford, England
