= New Dale Halt railway station =

Disused railway station in Shropshire, England

New Dale Halt
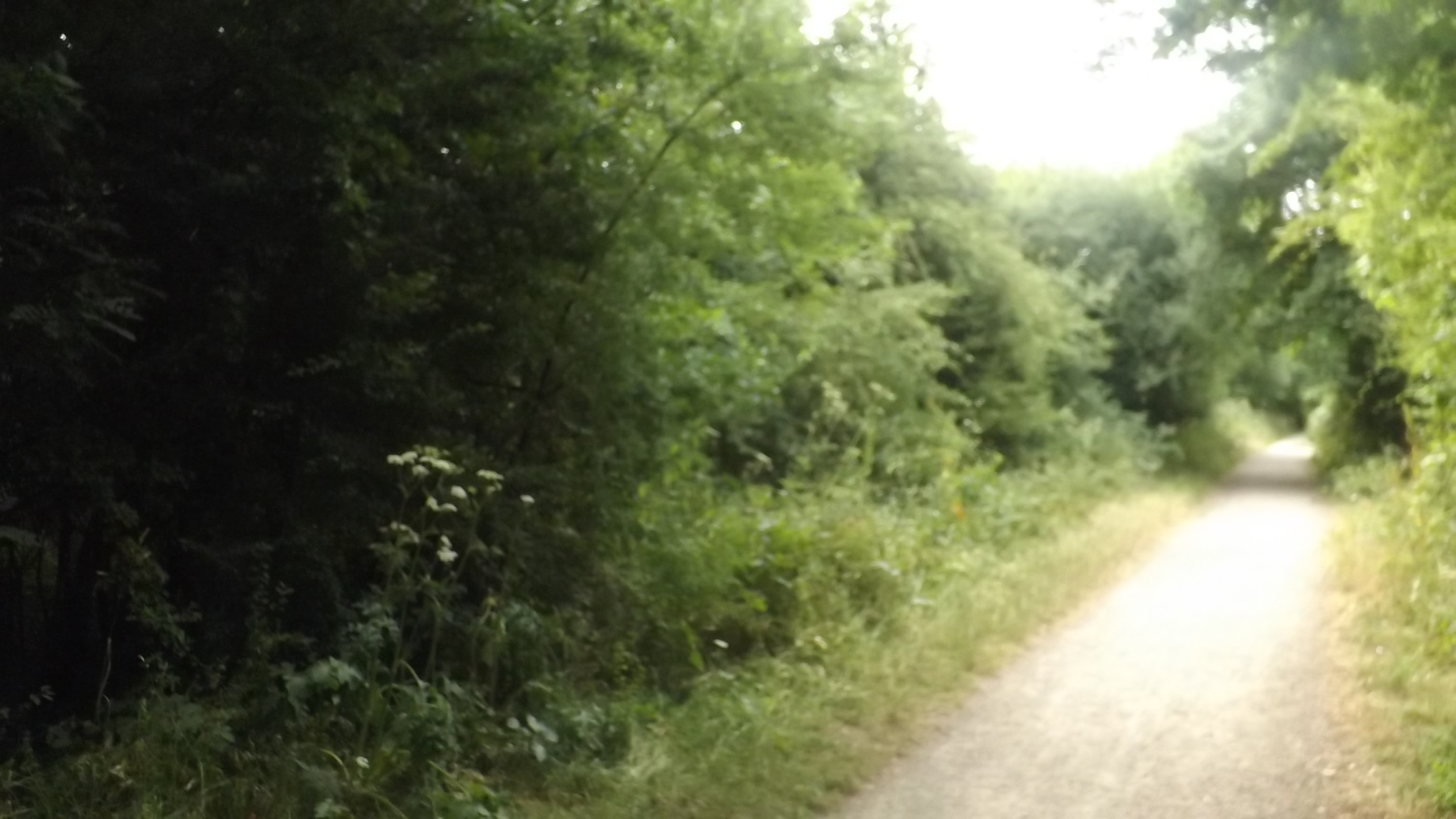

General information
- Location: Newdale and Overdale, Telford and Wrekin; England
- Coordinates: 52.6831°N 2.4798°W
- Grid reference: SJ676095
- Platforms: 1

Other information
- Status: Disused

History
- Post-grouping: Great Western Railway

Key dates
- 29 January 1934: Opened
- 23 July 1962: Closed
Location

New Dale Halt railway station was a station that served the Telford suburbs of Newdale and Overdale in Shropshire, England. The station was opened in 1934 and closed in 1962.

Preceding station	Disused railways	Following station
Ketley Town Halt; Line and station closed	Great Western Railway; Wellington to Craven Arms Railway	Lawley Bank; Line and station closed
