= Newdale, Shropshire =

Area of Telford, Shropshire, England

Coordinates: 52.682314°N 2.474808°W

Newdale
- Village
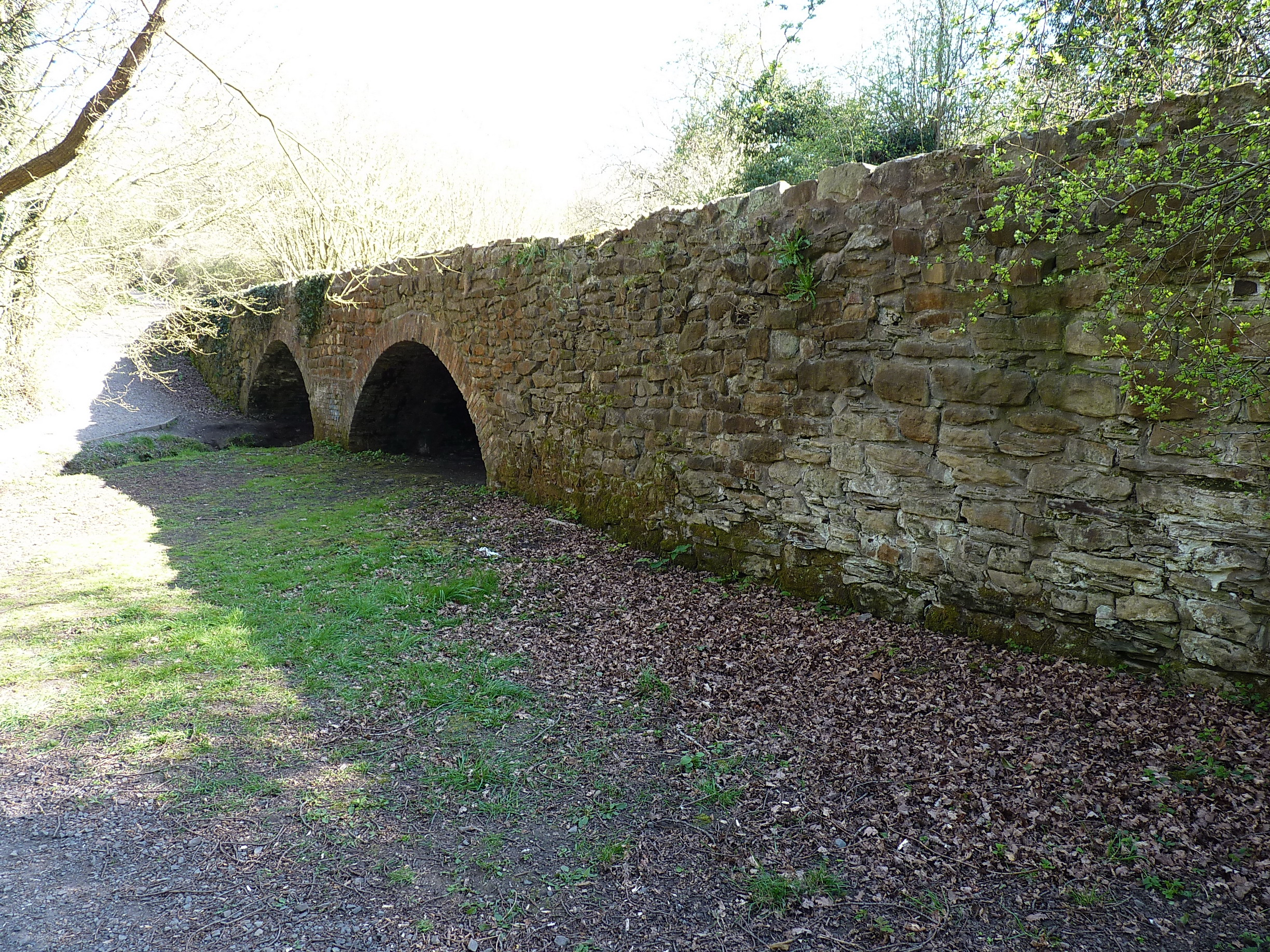
- The Newdale Tramway Bridge

- Location within Shropshire
- Civil parish: Lawley and Overdale
- Unitary authority: Telford and Wrekin
- Ceremonial county: Shropshire
- Region: West Midlands
- Country: England
- Sovereign state: United Kingdom
- Post town: TELFORD
- Postcode district: TF3
- Dialling code: 01952
- Police: West Mercia
- Fire: Shropshire
- Ambulance: West Midlands
- UK Parliament: Telford

Newdale, rebuilt as New Dale is an area of Telford in the borough of Telford and Wrekin in Shropshire, England. It is located northwest of the town centre of Telford. It forms part of the Lawley and Overdale civil parish.

== History ==
The original Newdale village was first recorded as nothing more than a small hamlet consisting primarily of a foundry, waterway and pond. In 1762, one of the buildings was used as a chapel by the Coalbrookdale Friends of the Quaker Movement. It was later used by followers of Methodism in 1853, who also used it as a chapel. After the Methodist followers left Newdale, the former chapel was reused as a barn.

== New village ==
The original Newdale village was abandoned around 1930, following the abandonment of the mining in the area. It was later demolished but in 1980, it was excavated before being filled back in. Newdale was rebuilt in a slightly different location, closer to the villages of Overdale and Lawley. It was renamed New Dale, to separate it from its predecessor.

== Newdale Tramway Bridge ==
An interesting landmark still well preserved is the Newdale Tramway Bridge, which is the last remaining relic of the former industrial lines around the local area. The bridge is now preserved as a Grade II listed building.

== Transport ==
The village was once served by the Wellington to Craven Arms Railway and New Dale Halt railway station was near the village, located north of Wrekin Way. It has since been demolished and is now part of a footpath.
