= Lawley Bank railway station =

Disused railway station in Shropshire, England

Lawley Bank
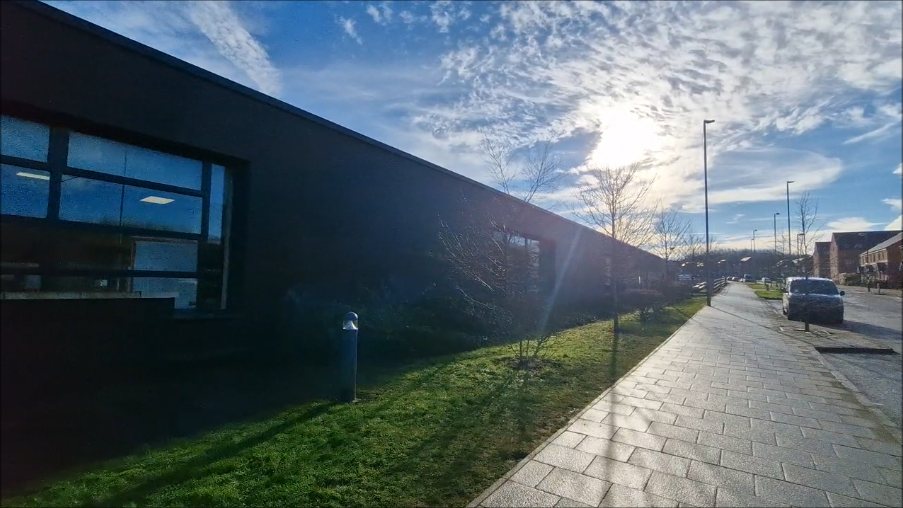
- Site of Lawley Bank

General information
- Location: Lawley, Telford and Wrekin; England
- Coordinates: 52.6753°N 2.4809°W
- Grid reference: SJ 675 087
- Platforms: 1

Other information
- Status: Disused

History
- Original company: Wellington and Severn Junction Railway
- Pre-grouping: Great Western Railway
- Post-grouping: Great Western Railway

Key dates
- 2 May 1859: Opened
- 1962: Closed
Location

Lawley Bank was a railway station that served the continuous settlements of Lawley Bank and Dawley Bank, in Shropshire, England.

== History ==
Opened 2 May 1859 on the Wellington to Craven Arms Railway, the station served the villages of Lawley and Dawley Bank. The station consisted of a simple setup which was similar to the other halts and stations along this line which included a booking office, waiting room, parcel storage and also a signal box with a level crossing on Station Road. There was also a small cross keepers cottage near the station. The station was also a single platform stop.

== Closure ==
The line between Wellington and Horsehay and Dawley was closed to passengers in 1962 and later to freight in 1964. This left the stub between Horsehay and Dawley and Lightmoor Junction to continue to be used by freight services until 1983. This section was later leased to the then-newly formed Telford Steam Railway. They reopened the station at Horsehay and Dawley and also built a new one adjacent to the station called Spring Village.

== Present day ==
Following closure of the station and line. The site was left abandoned along with the trackbed until the building of Birchfield Way and the Lawley Village Primary Academy School. As well as some residential properties in the late 2010's. This saw complete redevelopment of the site of the station and the former railway line between New Dale Halt and Heath Hill Tunnel. Nothing remains of the station today. In 2015, a new railway station was opened named Lawley Village on the Telford Steam Railway. This is located a short distance to the south of the former station.

Preceding station	Disused railways	Following station
New Dale Halt; Line and station closed	Great Western Railway; Wellington to Craven Arms Railway	Horsehay and Dawley; Line and station open
