= Wrekin Giants =

American football team in Telford, Shropshire, England

The Wrekin Giants, later the Shropshire Giants, and, subsequently, the Cannock Chase Giants were an American football team based in Telford, Shropshire, in England, in the United Kingdom. They were formed in 1985.

== History ==
=== 1985-1989 ===
Their home stadium was the GKN Sankey stadium in Telford and their colours were Black/Black/Black.

They were Conference champions in 1986 and were for a time Shropshire's only American Football team.

They were surprise Budweiser Bowl quarter-finalists in 1986 and also played in the Budweiser Leagues in 1987 and 1988. However, they did not manage to make the Premier Division playoffs. The Youth Two Touch side played for one season in 1988.

Their career record, senior kitted only, was 27–14–0.

Senior Kitted

- 1988 Budweiser League Premier Division North Midlands Conference 7–3–0
- 1987 Budweiser League Premier Division Northern Conference 5–5–0
- 1986 Budweiser League Atlantic Division One South 10–0–0*
- 1985 UKAFA Central Conference 4–4–0*

Youth Two Touch

- 1988 JAFL Midlands Conference 7–1–0* Defeated Rotherham Braves (18–6), Lincoln Bombers (19–7) en route to quarter-finals. Wrekin's pitch was unplayable and the win awarded to the Northants Storm Jnrs.

=== 1989 as Shropshire Giants ===
In 1989 they became Shropshire Giants which had a career record of 11–1–0.

They were JAFL Youth Two Touch runners-up 1989 and conference champions in 1989 also. Their 1989 JAFL West Midlands Conference record was 8–0–0.

They then beat Derby 26–8 in the first round. They won their semi-final 6–0 against the Rotherham Braves but lost the final 28–0 against the Kent Rams at Alexander Stadium in Birmingham.

=== 1989-1993/4 as Cannock Chase Giants ===
At the end of 1989 they had a re-building year as they moved to Cannock in the CGL and became the Cannock Chase Giants.

Their stadium was Cannock Festival Stadium in Cannock with a Career Record of 5-15-0 and colours Black/Black/Silver.

They were the NPL runners in 1993, 1992, 1989.

In the BAFA Leagues in 1990 (BNGL National Division Northern Conference 4–6–0) and 1989 (CGL Crown National Division Northern Conference 1–9–0).

Their record for the National Passball League was:

- 1993 NPL Northern Conference champions*
- 1992 NPL Northern Conference champions*
- 1991 NPL Northern Conference 4–1–0*
- 1990 NPL Northern Conference 3–1–0*
- 1989 NPL Central Conference 6–0–2*

They progressed moderately as they posted a 4-6-0 record in their final year. Lost the NPL final in 1989 38–20 to the Thames Valley Thunderbolts.

The Cannock Chase Giants then disbanded/merged with the Wolverhampton Outlaws in 1993/1994.
