= The Rock, Shropshire =

Hamlet in Shropshire, England

Coordinates: 52.679297°N 2.471396°W

The Rock
- Hamlet
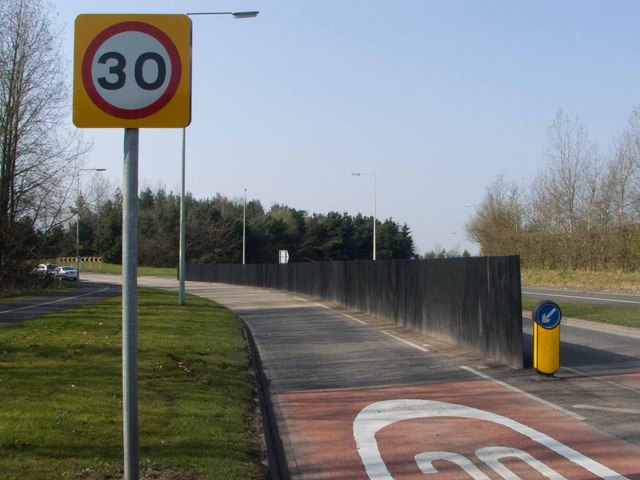
- Old Park Roundabout, near to The Rock, Telford

- Location within Shropshire
- OS grid reference: SJ685094
- Civil parish: Lawley and Overdale
- Unitary authority: Telford and Wrekin
- Ceremonial county: Shropshire
- Region: West Midlands
- Country: England
- Sovereign state: United Kingdom
- Post town: TELFORD
- Postcode district: TF3
- Police: West Mercia
- Fire: Shropshire
- Ambulance: West Midlands
- UK Parliament: Telford

The Rock is an area of Telford in the Telford and Wrekin borough of Shropshire, England. It is a ward of the Lawley and Overdale civil parish.

== History ==
The area was originally named after the nearby colliery in 1882. It was called Rock Colliery and was slightly to the south of the hamlet. There was also a Primitive Methodist chapel and engine house. The area was later incorporated into the-then new town of Telford.

== Transport ==
The area is served by buses that connect The Rock to the nearby settlements around Telford.
