= Telford Steam Railway =

Heritage railway in Shropshire, England

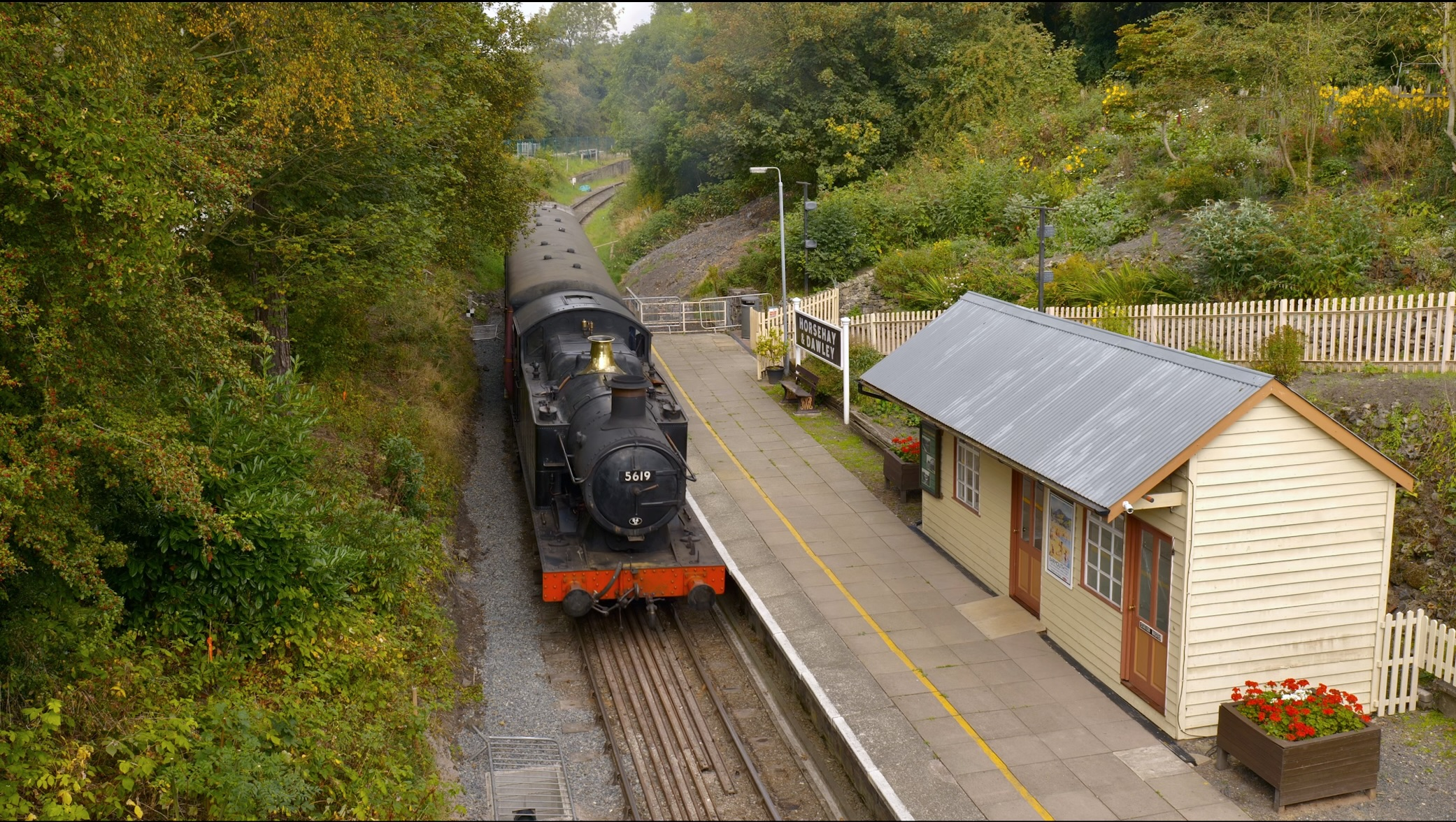
- Locale: Horsehay, Shropshire, England
- Terminus: Spring Village, Horsehay & Dawley

Commercial operations
- Name: Wellington & Severn Junction Railway
- Original gauge: 4 ft 8 1/2 in (1,435 mm) standard gauge

Preserved operations
- Operated by: Telford Horsehay Steam Trust
- Stations: 3
- Length: 1.0 mile (1.6 km)
- Preserved gauge: 4 ft 8 1/2 in (1,435 mm) standard gauge

Commercial history
- Opened: 1859
- Closed: 1964 (Ketley to Horsehay Summit) 1983 (Lightmoor to Horsehay)

Preservation history
- 1976: Telford Horsehay Steam Trust formed
- 1981: 5619 steams for the 1st time in preservation
- 1983: Lightmoor to Horsehay leased to THST
- 1984: Opens to the public
- 2008: Work begins on Lawley Extension
- 2009: 150th anniversary of opening of W&SJR
- 2015: Lawley Village opens
- 2016: Polar Express launched
- 2019: Work begins on relaying track south to Doseley road crossing

The Telford Steam Railway (TSR) is a heritage railway located at Horsehay, Telford in Shropshire, England, formed in 1976.

The railway is operated by volunteers on Sundays and Bank Holidays from Easter to the end of September, and at Christmas. Its official business name is the Telford Horsehay Steam Trust (THST), and it is a registered charity.

== History ==
Telford Steam Railway operates over a portion of the Wellington and Severn Junction railway (W&SJR). The line to Lightmoor and beyond to Buildwas was constructed by the Wenlock, Craven Arms and Lightmoor Extension railway. Both of these became a part of the Wellington to Craven Arms Railway.

For most of its working life the line was operated by the Great Western Railway and subsequently the Western Region of British Railways.

The line directions between Buildwas and Lightmoor were counter-intuitive for a period when the line going down the hill was the Up Line (towards London), and the line going up the hill was the Down Line (away from London), as the direction towards London from Lightmoor Junction was then considered to be routed via the former Severn Valley line. Since the last change the up direction is now completely intuitive.

Passenger services between Buildwas and Wellington ended on 23 July 1962, pre-dating the publication of the 'Beeching Report' in March 1963. Freight traffic lasted until 1983 when the line from Lightmoor Junction to Lawley was closed by BR.

== Stations ==
The preserved railway operates between Horsehay & Dawley station and Lawley Village station on the former W&SJR. A third station named Spring Village was built for the heritage railway at the end of a short spur off the running line.

Spring Village (52.6628°N 2.4826°W) has station buildings, a single platform, passenger shelter and a crossing into an engine shed on Pool Side. Work began on the station in 1976 and it was officially opened to the public in 1984. The site occupies part of a former siding to a nearby ironworks on the former Wellington to Craven Arms Railway. Beyond Spring Village platform is the former goods transhipment shed, built in 1860, which had originally permitted the transfer of goods from the W&SJR to the Coalbrookdale Company's narrow gauge plateway system. The building now serves as the railway's engine shed.

Horsehay and Dawley station platform (52.6630°N 2.4816°W) is adjacent to Spring Village station on a north–south through line, beneath Bridge Road. In between the two station platforms are the sidings and yard used for storing and maintaining the railway's stock.

After completing the works needed to restore the Grade II listed Heath Hill Tunnel and relaying the tracks through it, a new station was planned for a site near the former trackbed towards Wellington. In 2005 work began on the station in the village of Lawley. The station, named Lawley Village (52.6716°N 2.4799°W) was officially opened a decade later in 2015 as the northern terminus of the line from Horsehay and Dawley and Spring Village stations. It consists of a single platform with a passenger shelter. Lawley Bank station, which closed in 1962, was located north of the modern day station.

== Preservation ==
Telford Horsehay Steam Trust was formed in 1974. An extension through Heath Hill Tunnel to Lawley Village was completed in 2015.

Telford Steam Railway's regular passenger timetable consists of a departure from Spring Village north to Lawley Village and then back along the line to stop at Horsehay & Dawley. The train then repeats this journey in reverse, for a round trip taking 50 minutes.

In addition to the standard gauge running line, the railway also operates a short 2 ft (610 mm) narrow gauge line adjacent to Horsehay Pool. The Phoenix Model Engineering Society operates a 5 in (127 mm) miniature railway on the Spring Village site.

A large OO gauge model railway of Stafford railway station and a cafe are situated at Horsehay & Dawley Station.

=== Expansion ===
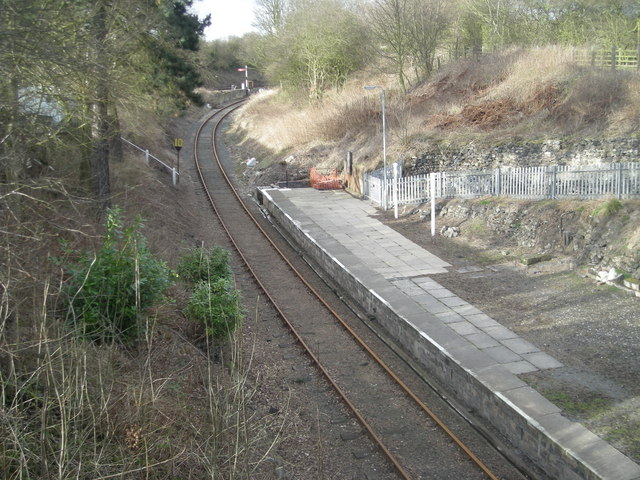
Horsehay & Dawley station. The signal in the middle distance marks the junction of the spur into Spring Village station and the yard, which is to the left

Telford Steam Railway intends to extend south beyond Horsehay & Dawley station to Doseley Halt, build a new bridge over the A4169 and continue to the Ironbridge Gorge passing through Coalbrookdale and eventually onto the power station site at Buildwas. South of Doseley, half a mile (0.8 km) of trackbed and two missing level crossings separate TSR's current railhead from the A4169 and Lightmoor Junction. Permission was given in June 2014 by Telford and Wrekin Council for trains to operate south to Doseley once all trackworks and building works have been completed. It was expected for work to commence south from Horsehay & Dawley station to Doseley Halt in the summer of 2015.

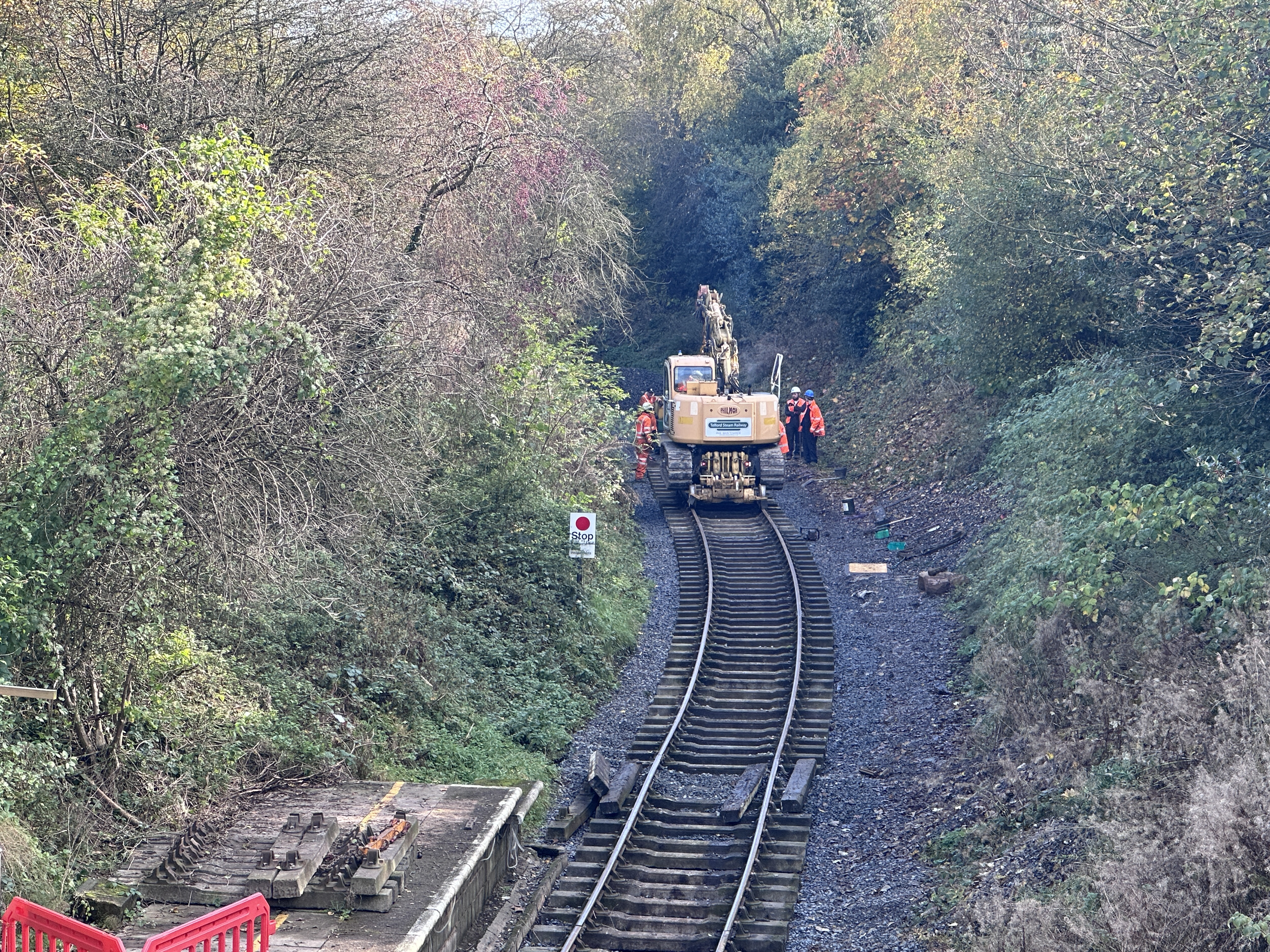
A road-rail excavator at the southern end of Horsehay & Dawley station.

Although from the road it appears the formation would have to be raised by a prohibitive amount to achieve the statutory headroom below the bridge over the A4169, surveying by Telford Horsehay Steam Trust confirmed that a modest increase in height will provide the necessary clearance without increasing the already steep gradient between Doseley station and Lightmoor Junction. Network Rail have donated a fabricated steel bridge that will be suitable to span the road which arrived at Spring Village in October 2010.

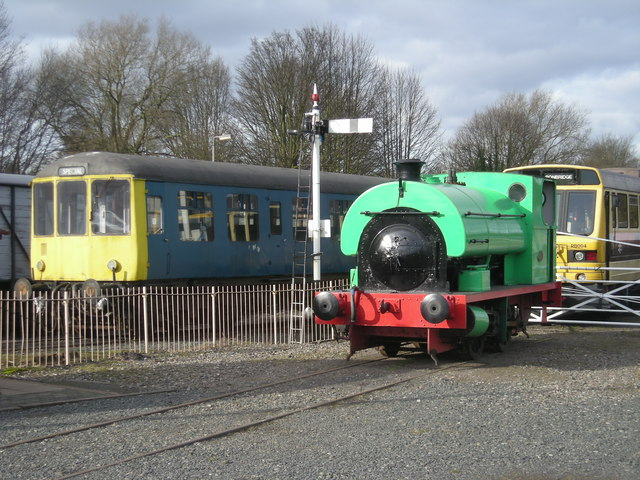
Class 104 53531, Ironbridge No3 and RB004 in Spring Village Yard

The extension south of Lightmoor is dependent upon Telford Steam Railway securing the redundant half of the former double track from Lightmoor to Buildwas and reinstating the missing portion of the bridge over Brick Kiln Bank. This bridge was previously reduced to a single track width when Network Rail replaced the original double track width brick arch with single track width concrete section.

In October 2006, with the abolition of Lightmoor Junction, Network Rail took the uphill line out of use; the former downhill line becoming a bi-directional extension of the existing single line from Madeley Junction. Telford Steam Railway plans to use the uphill line as its route into the Ironbridge Gorge including extension over Coalbrookdale Viaduct and across the Albert Edward Bridge onto the power station site, at Buildwas, when it closes. TSR intends to reinstate Coalbrookdale station to serve the Ironbridge Gorge Trust's Museum of Iron, Coalbrookdale's original station buildings survive as part of the Green Wood Centre's Woodland Experience site.

In August 2008 Telford Steam Railway concluded negotiations with Network Rail for the lease and occupation of Lightmoor Junction Signal Box. Restoration progressed steadily throughout the following years.

On 16 July 2010 the Shropshire Star published a video interview with Regeneration chief Councillor Eric Carter of Telford and Wrekin Council, in which he discussed proposals by Telford Steam Railway to operate to the site of Ironbridge Power Station after its scheduled closure in 2015.

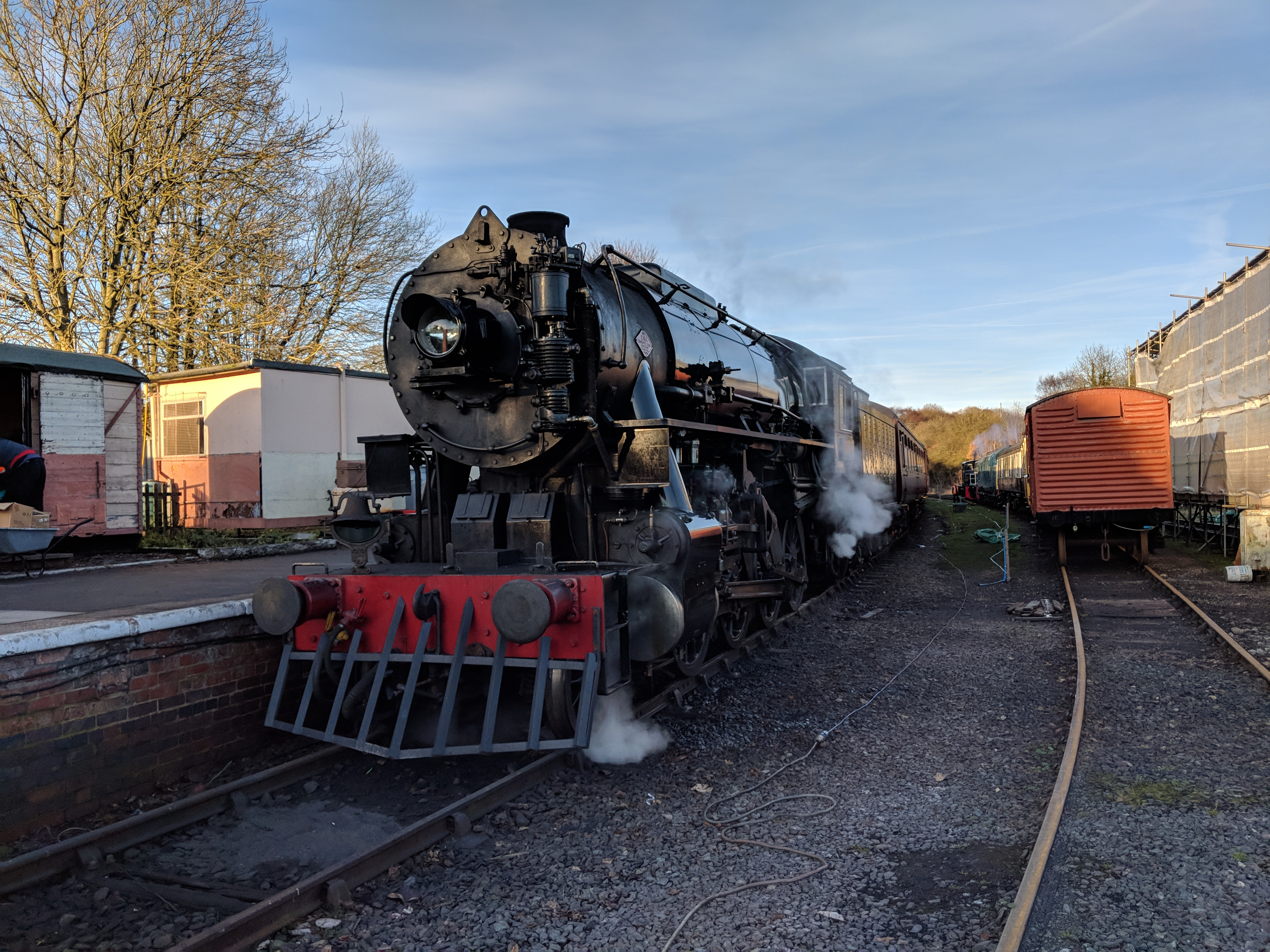
S160 standing at Spring Village awaiting the green flag to start the day pulling The Polar Express

In 2016, the Telford Steam Railway started their now flagship event of the year, The Polar Express, which is run throughout December. The train consisted of a hired S160 steam locomotive from Churnet Valley Railway, 4 coaches plus a banking locomotive (in this case 08757), The event was a major success for the TSR, bringing in the much needed funds for the extensions and to upgrade and improve their current site and rolling stock.

Prior to The Polar Express of 2017, extensive work was carried out on both Horsehay and Dawley station and Spring Village to extend the platforms to take the longer 4 coach train along with a new station building being erected on Horsehay and Dawley platform, this will also help with train lengths when the trains run through from Lawley to Ironbridge which are foreseen to consist of a locomotive and 4 coaches.

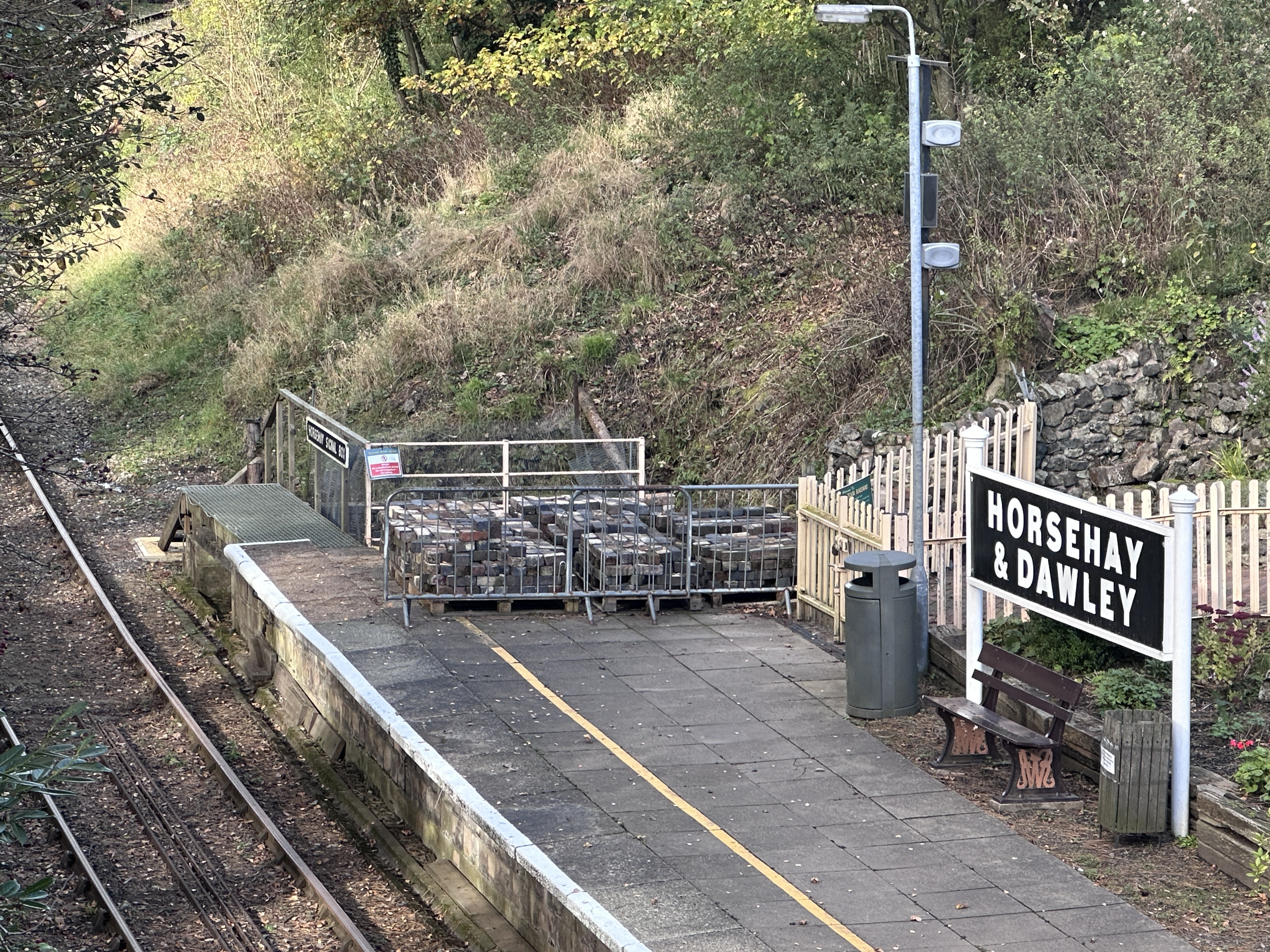
The site of Horsehay & Dawley signal box in October 2024. The thin wooden fence marks its perimeter.

As of the beginning of 2019, the track between Horsehay and Dawley and the level crossing at Doseley was removed prior to relaying at passenger carrying standards. In 2019, the Telford Steam Railway had also published its website for "Steaming to Ironbridge" outlining the proposed extension plans for the line into the power station site in Ironbridge, which is very well backed by both Telford and Wrekin and the owners of the power station site, Harworth. The site proposals for the site include a railway station using the existing railway line.

In 2024, Lightmoor Signal Box was badly damaged by vandals.

Also in 2024, work began to rebuild Horsehay & Dawley signal box.

== List of locomotives ==
Locomotive	Livery	Built	Current status	Notes
GWR 5600 Class 0-6-2T 5619	British Railways unlined black with early crest	1925	Operational, boiler ticket ends 2025	The only ex-mainline steam locomotive to reside at Telford. 5619 was originally purchased by the Telford Development Corporation from Barry scrapyard for static display at Horsehay goods shed. THST restored the loco to operational condition and it ran at Horsehay and many other preserved lines until its boiler certificate expired in 1991. In 1998 lottery funding was obtained to allow a full overhaul to begin; refurbishment of the frames and fitting of the wheels, cylinders, side tanks and bunker were completed at Horsehay. Boilerwork and final reassembly of the locomotive took place at the Flour Mill workshop, Lydney after further funding was provided by Alan Moore CBE. Returning to traffic after passing its final steam tests, it moved to the Avon Valley Railway for two weeks' running-in in February 2008. After attending TSR's Steam Gala in May 2008, it spent 2 years on hire at the Gloucestershire Warwickshire Railway, moving to the North Norfolk Railway in March 2010. Was on hire to the Midland Railway – Butterley from October 2016 until late 2017 and then went on hire to the Nene Valley Railway from February 2018. Was then on hire to the Swindon and Cricklade Railway from 2019 to late 2020. It spent its next hire period until late 2021 at the Epping Ongar Railway, before returning to the Telford Steam Railway to operate the Polar Express trains for that year. Following this, it went out on hire once more to the Llangollen Railway for their 2022 season, after having maintenance carried out at their MPD. Currently operating regular services at Telford until the end of 2025.
Peckett & Sons 0-4-0ST no 1722 "ROCKET"	Blue with yellow lining	1926	Under overhaul	0-4-0ST "Rocket". Built by Peckett and Sons Ltd of Bristol in 1926 to works order no. 1722, Rocket was employed by the Courtaulds Company at Coventry. It remained there throughout its working life and eventually found itself as part of the private "Shropshire Collection", near Shrewsbury. The complete collection was sold to the S & D Co. Ltd, who had Rocket restored to operational status by 2003. Rocket left Horsehay for overhaul at Tyseley Locomotive Works in March 2012, returning to public service in April 2014. The engine's boiler ticket expired in 2024 and it is currently under overhaul.
Peckett & Sons 0-4-0ST no 1990 "Ironbridge no 3"		1940	Stored awaiting overhaul	Ironbridge No3 at Horsehay, May 2007. Rocket can be seen in the background. 2023
British Rail Class 08 0-6-0DE no 08757 "EAGLE"	Rail Express Systems	1961	Operational	08757 in the yard in 2024 Originally numbered D3926. Named "Eagle C.U.R.C" (Cambridge University Railway Club). Fitted with remote control equipment in 2004 for use in Westbury Quarry where it remained until moving to Didcot around 2010. Moved to Crewe in 2016, it was put up for sale and bought by Telford Steam Railway. It arrived on 16 January 2017.
British Rail Class 03 0-6-0DM no D2051		1959	Under overhaul	Privately owned. Previously resided on the North Norfolk Railway from 2000 until 2024.
North British Locomotive Company 0-4-0DH no 27414 TOM	British Railways Black with early crest	1954	Operational	NBL Tom It has been at the TSR since the 1980s where it was donated from GKN Sankey in Hadley and is now in private ownership.
British Rail Class 37 CO-CO no 37263	British Rail Departmental Grey	1965	Operational	37263 at Kidderminster Built by the Vulcan Foundry in 1965 as D6963 and allocated to Darnall. Originally allocated to many Eastern Region depots, then moved to Scotland, before moving to Cardiff and then to Toton and Bescot. Transferred to EWS ownership in 1998 and stored in 1999. Initially went to the Dean Forest Railway, then moved to Tyseley for a number of years before being moved to Telford in 2017. In 2021, it was repainted in BR Departmental Grey. Since May 2023, 37263 has been on hire to the Severn Valley Railway.
Ruston & Hornsby 0-4-0DH (Privately owned) Class 165DS No. 313394 (D2971)	British Railways green	1952	Operational, away on hire to the Chasewater Railway	2971 at Spring Village Upon arrival at Horsehay, it was fitted with vacuum brakes to allow operation with passenger rolling stock. Affectionately known as "Jammo". Has since been repainted after arriving at the Chasewater Railway.
Ruston & Hornsby 0-4-0DH No. 525947	British Rail double-arrow blue	1968		525947 at Spring Village Affectionately known as "Rusty". Arriving at the TSR in 1995, it was bought from Blue Circle Industrials Ltd at Kirton Lindsey, Lincolnshire.
Ruston & Hornsby 0-4-0DH 88DS "Hector".	"Prussian" blue	1955		Named "Hector" Now having in depth restoration/mechanical overhaul after a change in ownership, Hector has been outshopped in a Prussian blue livery with yellow lining. Previously carried the fictional number D2959.

=== Notable rolling stock ===
- 1961 BR Mk 1 coach No. SC 14901. Originally built at Swindon as a standard compartment first, it was converted by BR into a prototype 1st Class Lounge Car as part of a project to produce stock to specifications formerly associated with Pullman services. Four of the conventional compartments were removed and replaced by two comfortable lounges, each seating ten passengers. As of April 2014 the coach is undergoing refurbishment for further passenger use. Currently, the newly arrived Mk2 stock has taken priority to be restored to use.

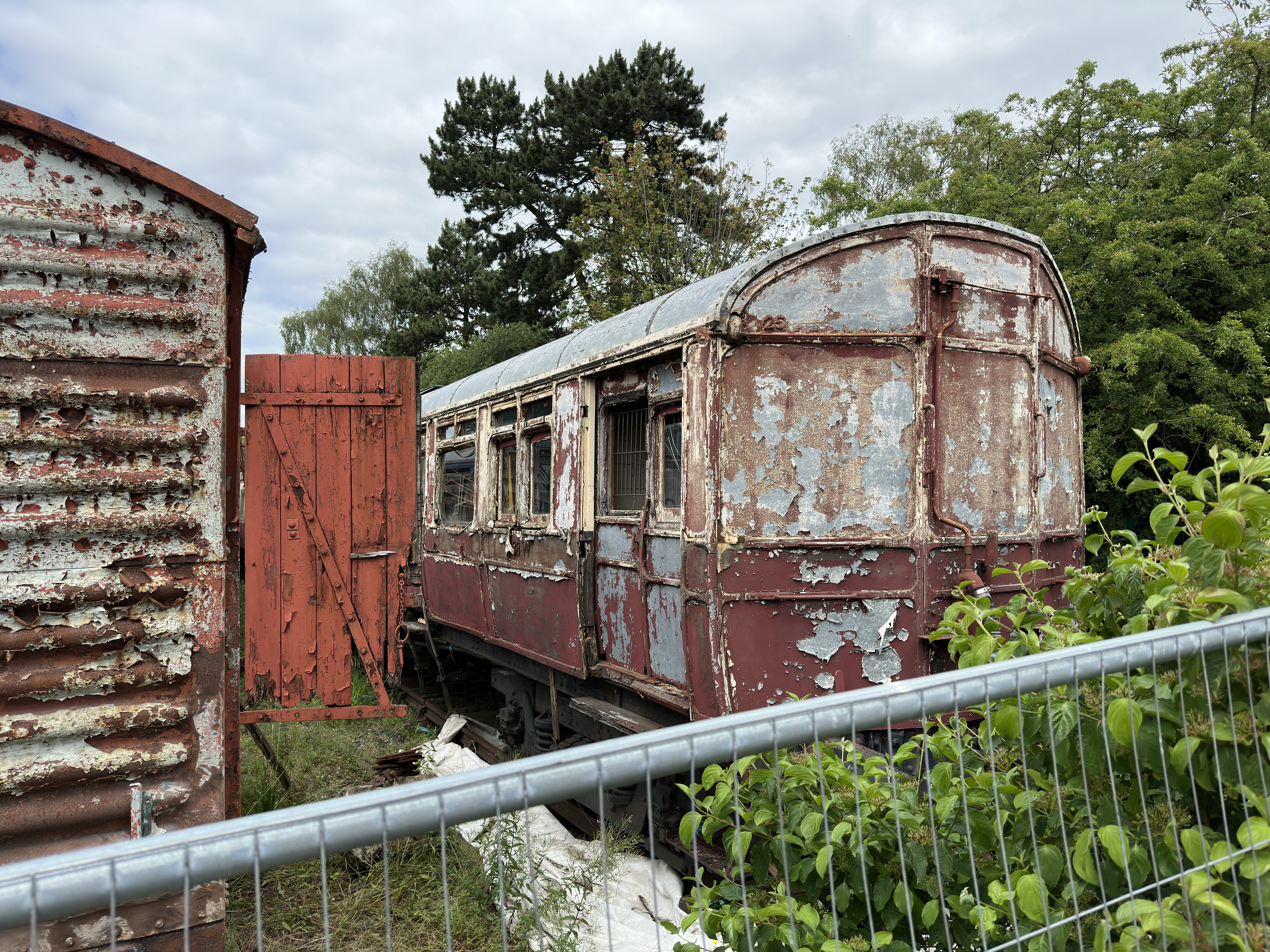
The Autocoach in the far siding in 2023.

- 1907 Great Western Railway Autocoach no 38. The oldest one in preservation. Currently in very poor condition in storage awaiting overhaul.

=== Narrow gauge locomotive ===
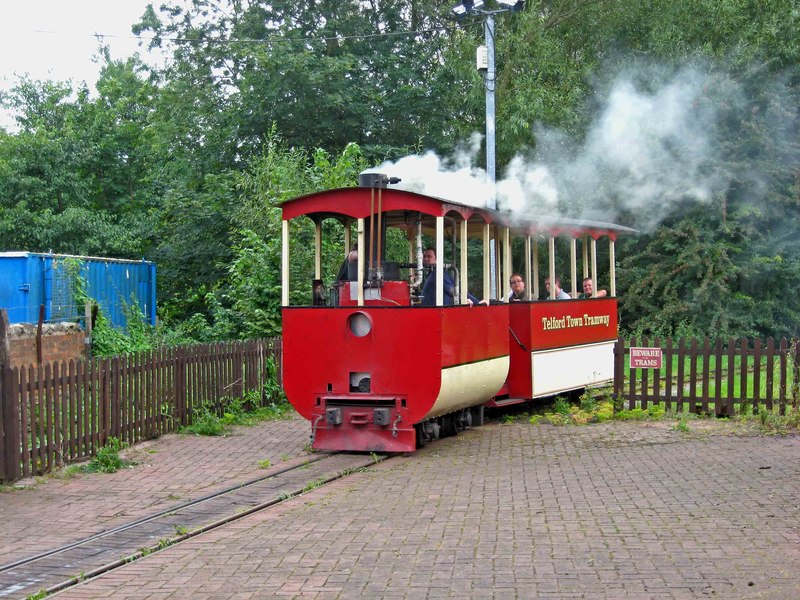
Telford steam tram

- Alan Keef Ltd 0-4-0 Steam Tram. The Telford Steam Railway's steam tram once ran along the side of the lake in Telford Town Park. Starting from the amphitheatre, the railway did not last very long and was relocated to the Telford Steam Railway in the mid-1980s, where it is still running today around a circular track around the railway's yard near Horsehay Pool.

== Plans ==
The preservation trust aims to extend the line southwards from Horsehay to the site of Ironbridge power station. This would see new stations opened at Doseley, Lightmoor, Coalbrookdale and close to Buildwas for Ironbridge, including proposals for a park and ride with passenger services between Ironbridge and Birmingham New Street.
