= Wolverhampton Outlaws =

The Wolverhampton Outlaws were an American football team based in Wolverhampton, England.

The Cannock Chase Giants (formerly Wrekin Giants), disbanded/merged with the Wolverhampton Outlaws back in 1993/1994.

The Outlaws' grounds were the Wolverhampton Rugby Club.

Their career record was 38-33-2 and their colours were Black/Black/Black & Orange.

They were Conference champions in 1991.

== Results ==
- 1992 BNGL National Division North/West Midlands Conference 1-9-0
- 1991 BNGL National Division Midlands Conference 9-1-0*
- 1990 BNGL National Division Midlands Conference 8-1-1*
- 1989 BNGL Premier Division Northern C Conference 7-2-1
- 1988 Budweiser League Division One Central Conference 6-4-0
- 1987 Budweiser League Division One Central Conference 2-8-0
- 1986 Budweiser League Atlantic Division One South 4-6-0

== History ==
Their first season was in 1986, founded in the year before that. They merged with Bilston Apaches. They progressed up through leagues over few years from the Division One to BNGL National League.

1990 saw Danny Martin returned 9 punts for TDs. They made the semi-finals in 1991, however, disbanded at the end of a poor 1992 season. Some players formed the West Bromwich Vipers, along with players from the defunct West Bromwich Fireballs and Wolverhampton Outlaws and Bilston Apaches, which later became the Wolverhampton Vipers.

== Imports ==
- 1990 - QB/Coach Scott Dangerfield

== Games notes ==
- 11 May 1991 - Led 63–0 at half-time against Charnwood Beacons, but eased up to win 89–0. 22 April 1990 - Danny Martin returned 3 punts and a kickoff for Tds vs. Chester Romans
