= Listed buildings in Lawley and Overdale =

Lawley and Overdale is a civil parish in the district of Telford and Wrekin, Shropshire, England. The parish contains four listed buildings that are recorded in the National Heritage List for England. All the listed buildings are designated at Grade II, the lowest of the three grades, which is applied to "buildings of national importance and special interest". The parish is mainly suburban, and the listed buildings consist of the remains of a tramway bridge, a railway tunnel, a house, and a church.

== Buildings ==
Name and location	Photograph	Date	Notes
Newdale Tramway Bridge; 52.68287°N 2.48118°W	—	c. 1795	The tramway carried material to and from the ironworks at Horsehay on the track between Coalbrookdale and Donnington Wood, and the remains of the bridge crossing a stream are virtually all that has survived. This consists of two small brick round arches and some stonework in the spandrels.
Lawley House Farmhouse; 52.67612°N 2.49113°W	—	Early 19th century	A red brick house with a tile roof and two storeys. It has an L-shaped plan, consisting of a three bay range and a projecting gabled wing on the left. The doorway has pilasters, an entablature, and a rectangular fanlight, and the windows are casements.
Railway tunnel 52.66922°N 2.48022°W		1856	The tunnel was built by the Wellington and Severn Junction Railway to carry its line under Dawley Road (the A4169 road). It is in blue engineering brick with stone dressings, and consists of a parabolic arch. The portal at each end has rusticated voussoirs and a keystone. Above is a cornice, a parapet, and splayed and ramped abutment wings with stone coping and small end piers.
St John's Church; 52.67510°N 2.49340°W		1864–65	The church, designed by John Ladds, has Romanesque features and is built in polychromic brick with some stone dressings, and a banded tile roof. It consists of a nave with a south porch, a polygonal chancel, a north chapel, and a tower to the south of the chancel. The windows along the sides of the church are paired lancets with red voussoirs. The tower has round-headed bell openings and a pyramidal spire.
