= Dawley Bank =

Village in Shropshire, England

Coordinates: 52.673809°N 2.468521°W

- Village
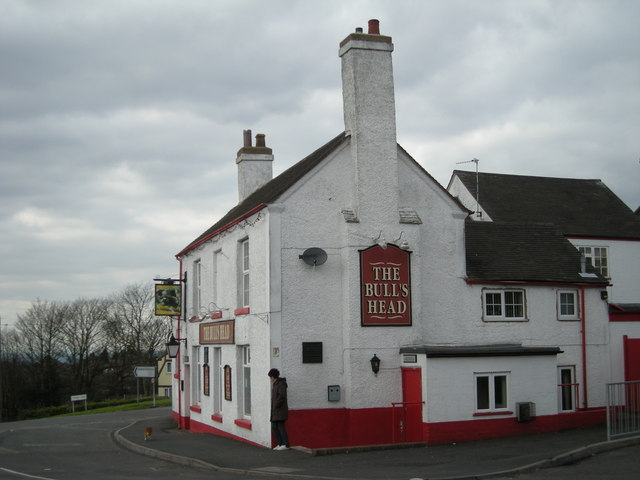
- The Bulls Head Pub in Dawley Bank

- Location within Shropshire
- OS grid reference: SJ681085
- Civil parish: Lawley and Overdale
- Unitary authority: Telford and Wrekin
- Ceremonial county: Shropshire
- Region: West Midlands
- Country: England
- Sovereign state: United Kingdom
- Post town: TELFORD
- Postcode district: TF4
- Dialling code: 01952
- Police: West Mercia
- Fire: Shropshire
- Ambulance: West Midlands
- UK Parliament: Telford

Dawley Bank is a former mining village and suburb of Telford and Dawley in the borough of Telford and Wrekin in Shropshire, England. It is part of the civil parish of Lawley and Overdale.

== History ==
Dawley Bank was built on the Shropshire Coalfield alongside the neighbouring village of Lawley Bank during the Industrial Revolution. There were multiple types of industry including concrete plants, brickworks and factories opening in and around the village. The village later became part of the Dawley New Town in 1963, which later became Telford.

Dawley Bank is mentioned in John Betjeman's poem "A Shropshire Lad", about swimmer Matthew Webb, born in Dawley: it refers to his ghost "swimming along the old canal / That carried the bricks to Lawley ... And paying a call at Dawley Bank while swimming along to Heaven".

== Amenities ==
Most of the villages amenities are located on Milners Lane. There are public houses, a shop and a Baptist church.

== Transport ==
There are regular buses through the village between Telford, Dawley, Much Wenlock, Bridgnorth and Wellington.
