= Telford =

Town in Shropshire, England

Coordinates: 52.6766°N 2.4469°W

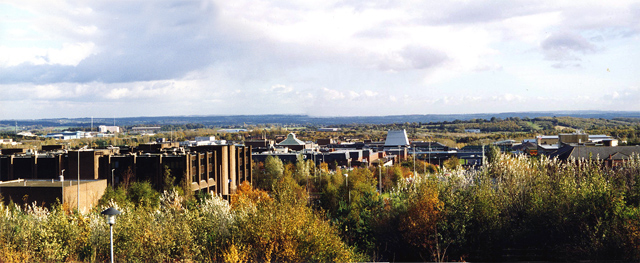
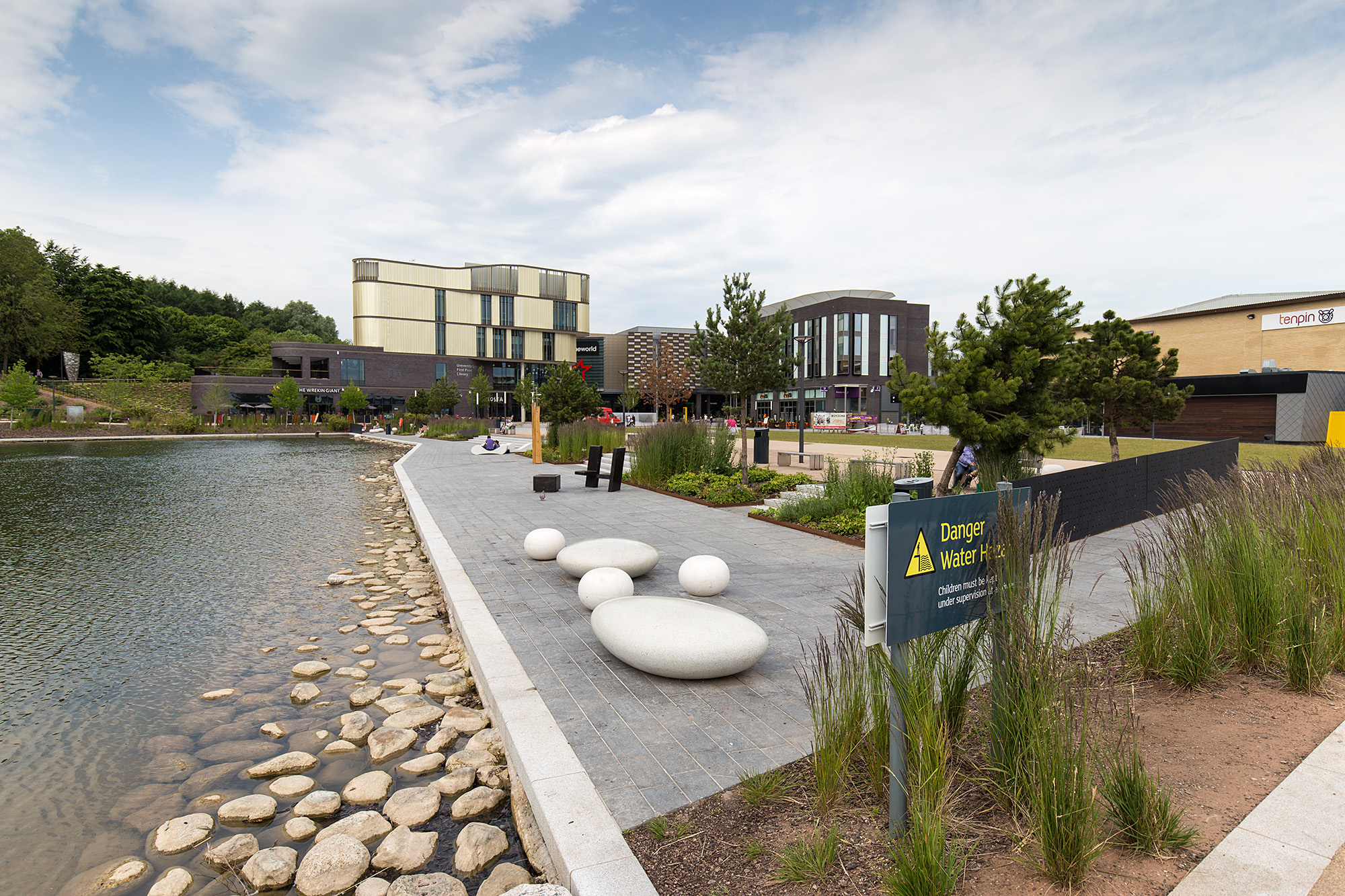
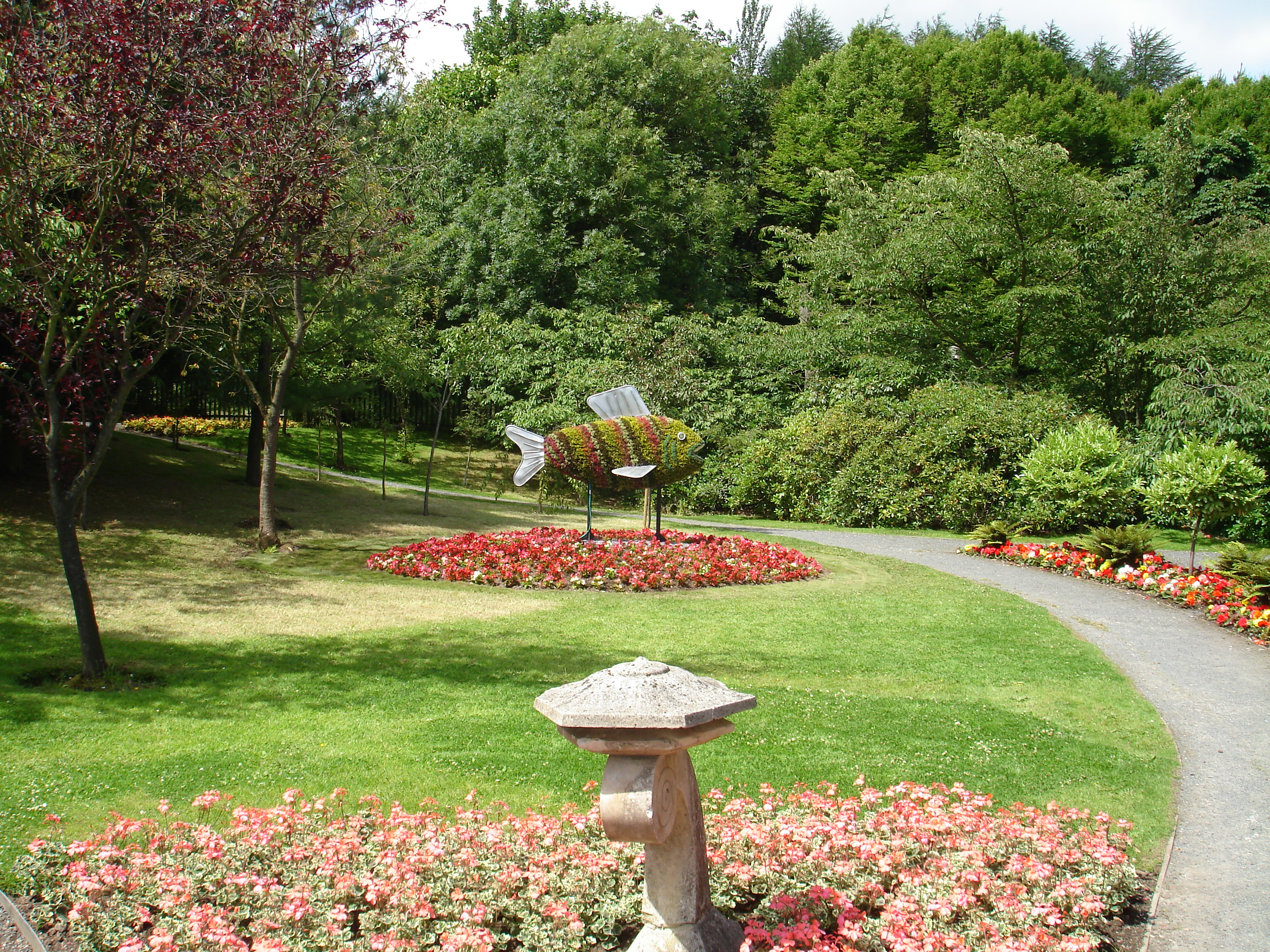
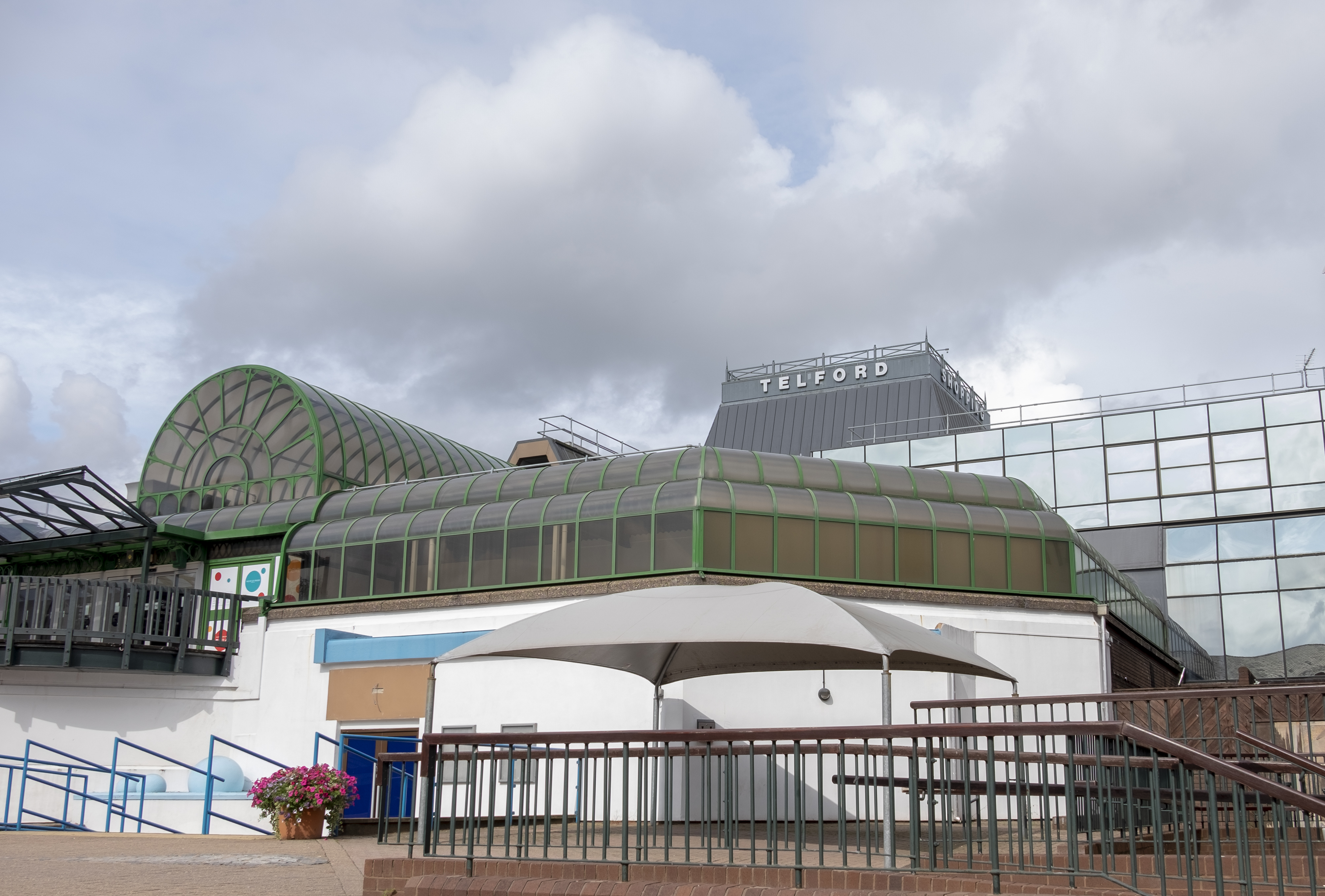
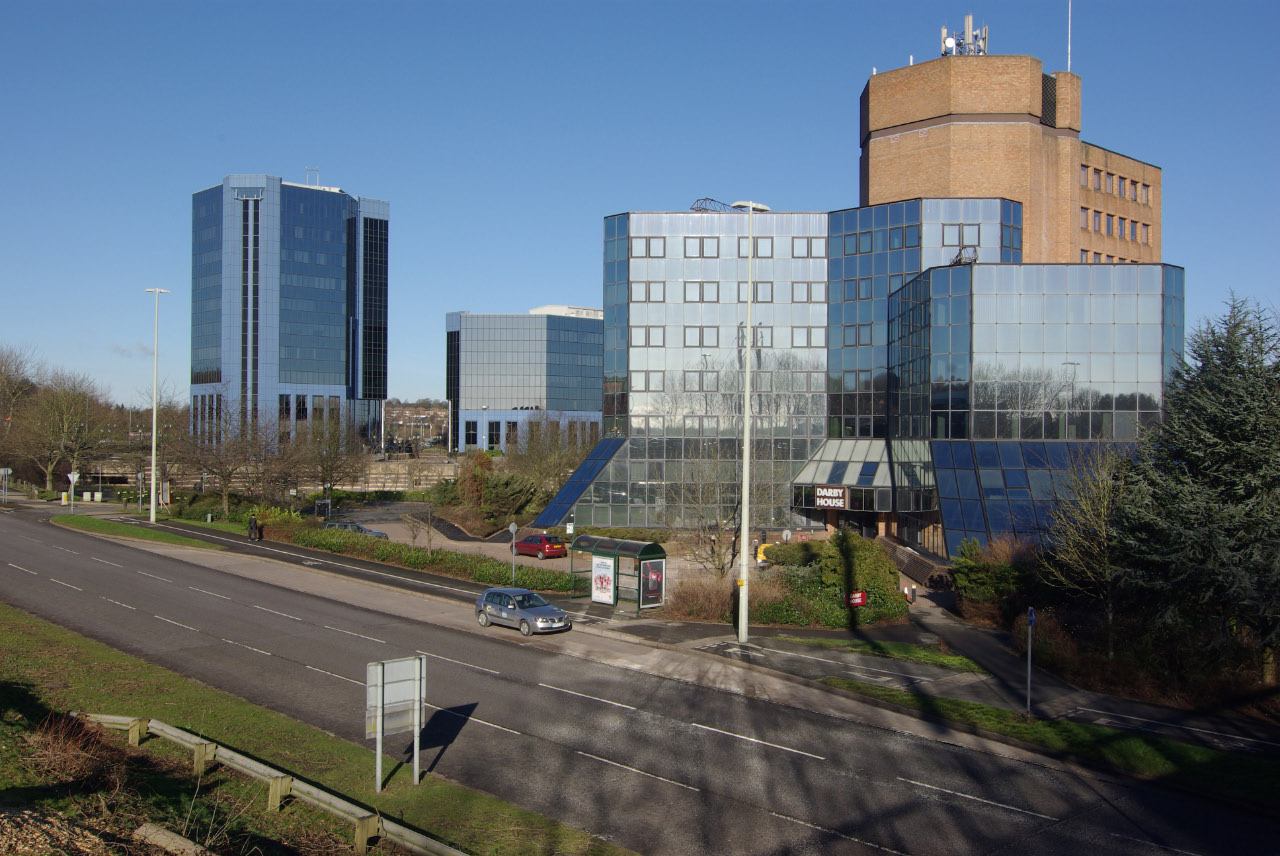
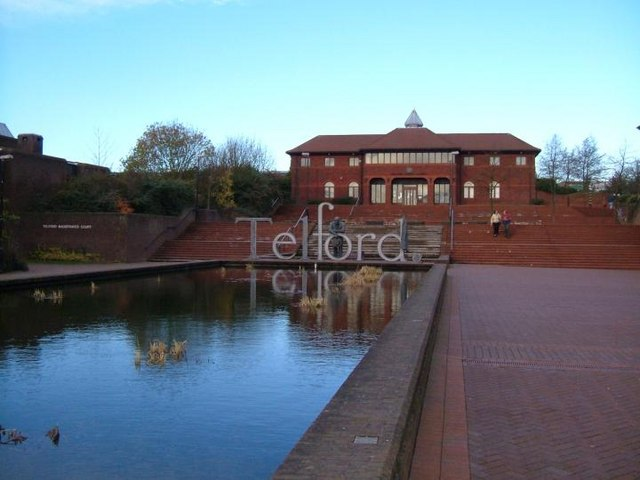
- From top, left to right: Telford centre's skyline, Southwater, Town Park, Telford Centre, Lawn Central and Thomas Telford Sculpture

- Location within Shropshire
- Interactive map of Telford
- Population: 156,896 (2021 Census)
- OS grid reference: SJ698088
  - London: 140 mi (230 km) SE
- Unitary authority: Telford and Wrekin
- Ceremonial county: Shropshire
- Region: West Midlands
- Country: England
- Sovereign state: United Kingdom
- Areas of the town: List: Brookside; Central Park; Dawley Bank (Part); Hollinswood; Holmer Lake; Lawley Bank; Lawley Furnaces; Lawley (Village); Malinslee (Part); Naird Lane; Newdale (Village); Old Park; Overdale; Stafford Park; Stirchley (Village); Telford Central; Town Park; The Rock
- Post town: TELFORD
- Postcode district: TF1–5, TF7
- Dialling code: 01952
- Police: West Mercia
- Fire: Shropshire
- Ambulance: West Midlands
- UK Parliament: Telford; The Wrekin

Telford (/ˈtɛlfərd/) is a town in the Telford and Wrekin borough in Shropshire, England. The wider borough covers the town, its suburbs and surrounding towns and villages. The town is close to the county's eastern boundary, and near the River Severn. The notable hill near the town called The Wrekin is part of the Shropshire Hills, an Area of Outstanding Natural Beauty. To the south of the town is the Ironbridge Gorge, a UNESCO World Heritage Site. Places around the Ironbridge Gorge area, which were developed into the town itself, are internationally recognised as being "The Birthplace of Industry" being to a large extent constructed during the Industrial Revolution on the Shropshire Coalfield. The town is the main administrative centre for Telford and Wrekin Council.

The M54 motorway was completed in 1983, improving the town's road links with the West Midlands conurbation, Wolverhampton is 19 miles (31 km) south east and Birmingham is 28 miles (45 km) in the same direction. In the 2021 census, the town had a population of 156,896 while the wider borough had an estimated population of 185,600. It is the most populous settlement in Shropshire and is nearly twice the size of Shropshire's historic county town, Shrewsbury, 15 miles (24 km) to the west. It is near Staffordshire: Stafford is 21 miles (34 km) to the east and Stoke-on-Trent is 25 miles (40 km) north east from the town.

The town is polycentric, having been designated under the New Towns Acts in 1963 and 1968 and developed between the 1960s to the 1970s. Centred on a shopping centre and a public park, the new town is named after Thomas Telford, a civil engineer on many road, canal and rail projects in the county. It was originally designated under the name Dawley New Town. As well as multiple villages and Dawley, the other constituent towns are Coalbrookdale, Madeley, Newport, Oakengates and Wellington.

== History ==
=== Early history ===
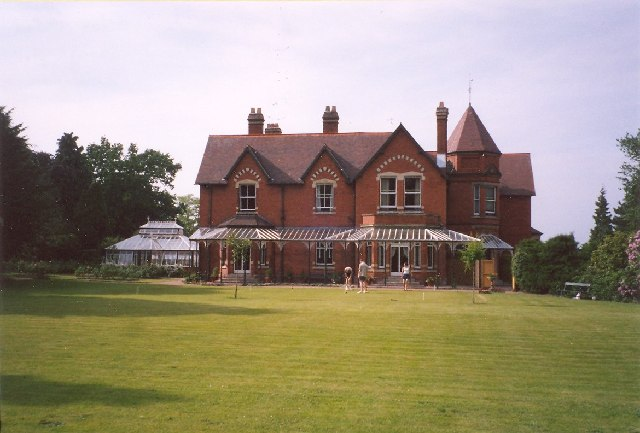
Sunnycroft near Wellington

Early settlement in the area was thought to be on the land that sloped up from the Weald Moors (an area north of the town centre) towards the line along which the Roman Watling Street was built. Farmland surrounded three large estates in the 10th century, namely Wellington, Wrockwardine and Lilleshall.

From the 13th century there was urban development in Wellington and Madeley, where Wenlock Priory founded a new town. Six monastic houses, founded in the 11th and 12th centuries, had large interests in the area's economic growth. They collectively acquired almost half of the area and profited from coal and ironstone mines and iron smithies on their estates.

The area was the site of the 1821 Cinderloo Uprising, which saw 3,000 people protest against the lowering of wages for those working in the local coal industry. The protests resulted in the deaths of three striking colliers.

=== Modern history ===
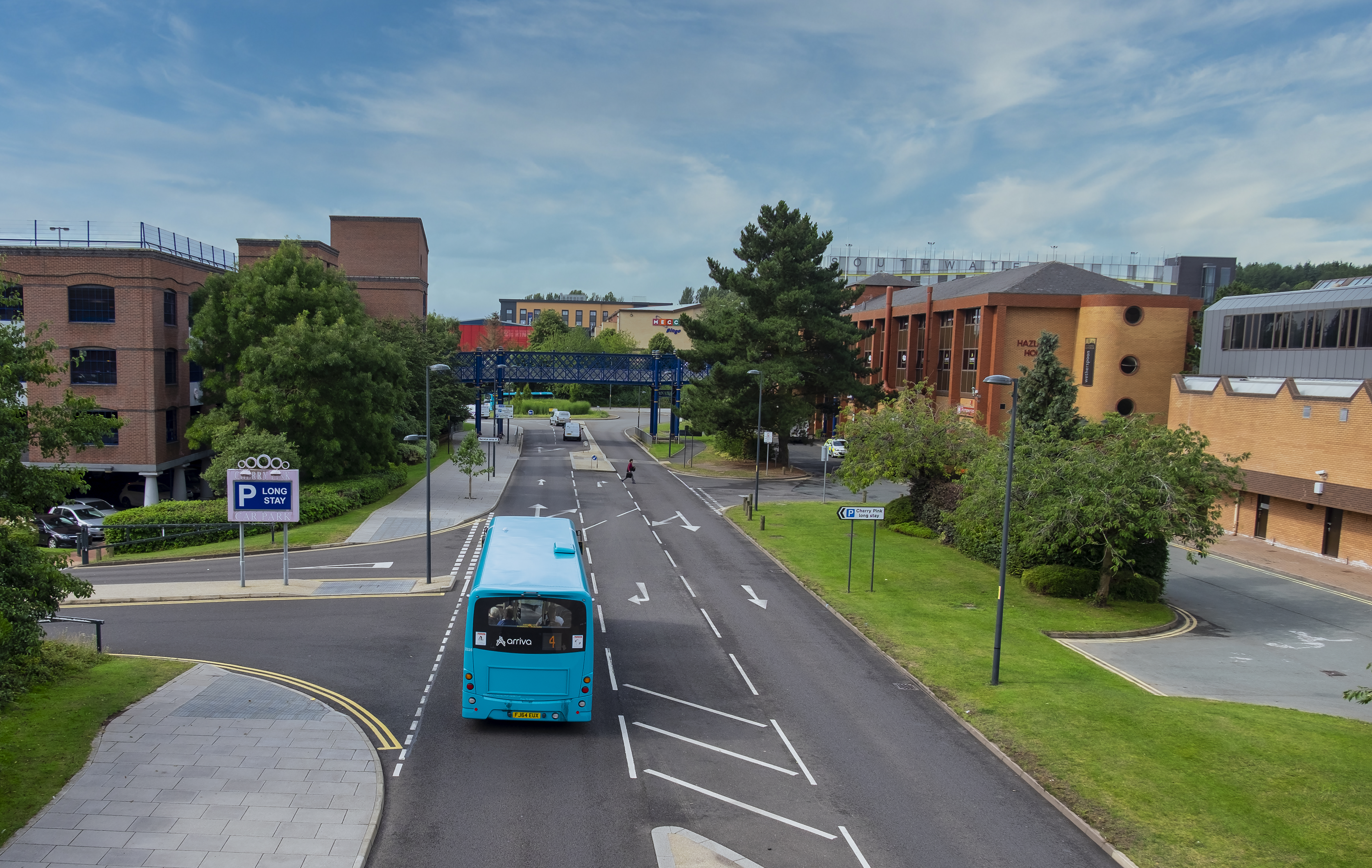
Telford Town Centre looking towards Southwater

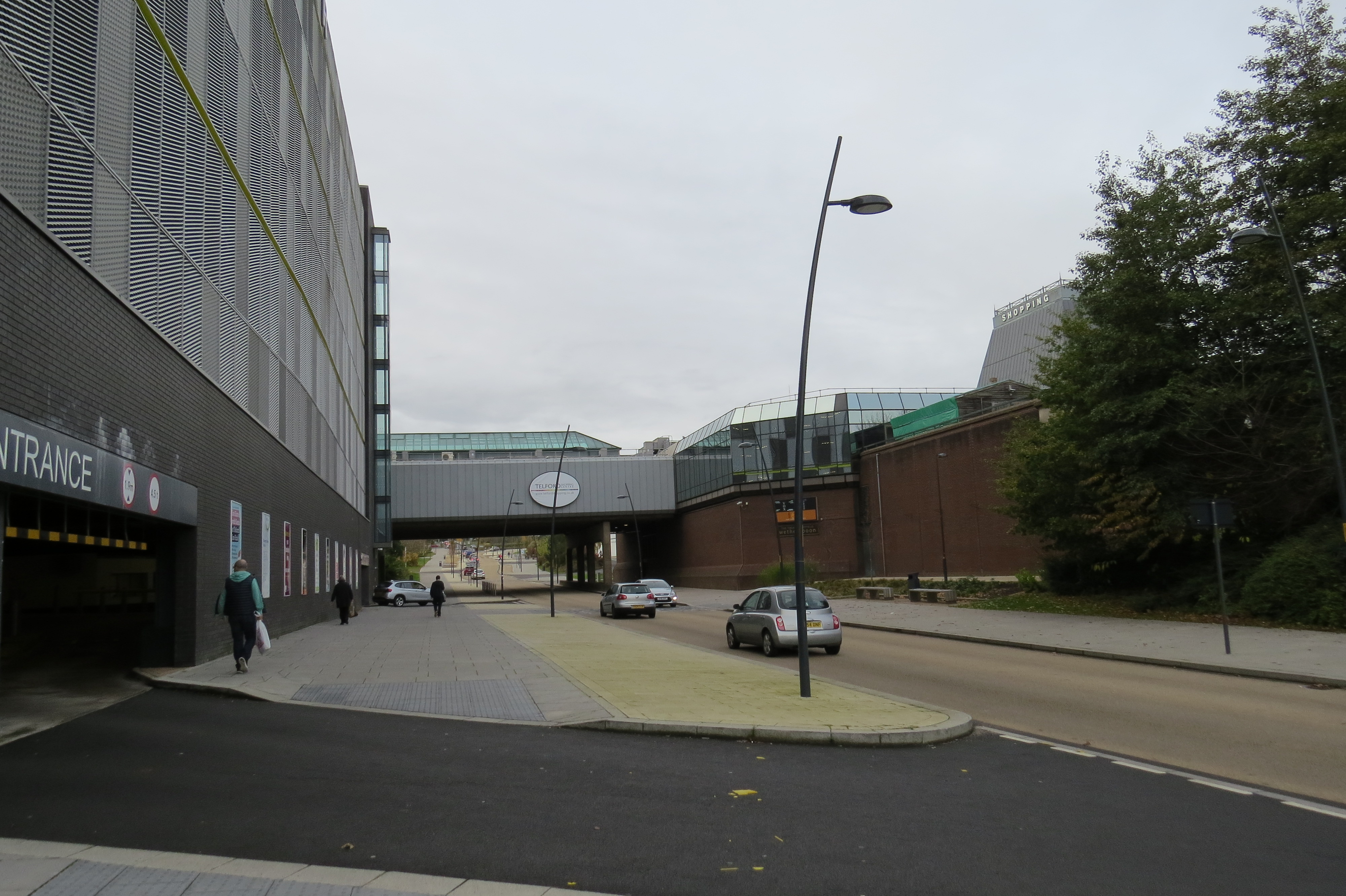
Northfield Street Telford Centre

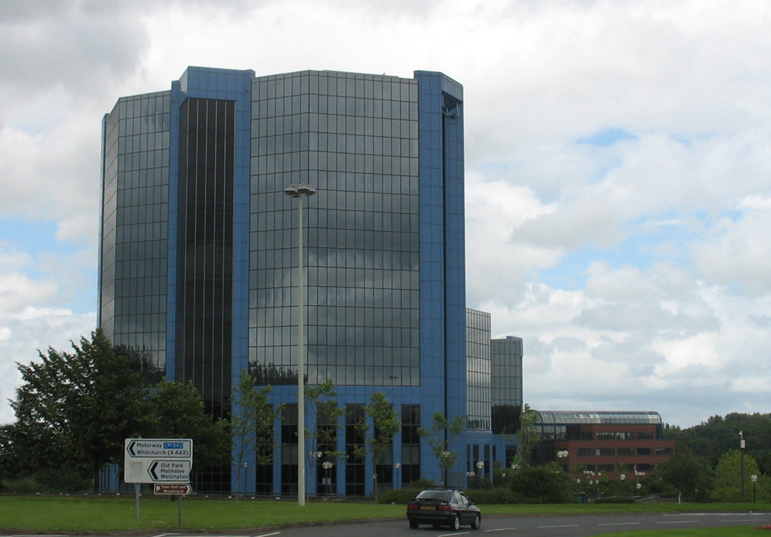
Telford Plaza in Telford Town Centre

The New Town was first designated on 16 January 1963 by the Conservative administration as Dawley New Town, covering 9,100 acres (37 km^{2}) of Dawley, Wenlock, Oakengates, Wellington Rural District and Shifnal Rural District. Development started, guided by the Dawley New Town Development Corporation, with the first homes on the new Sutton Hill housing estate being occupied in 1967. Initial planning and design concepts for Dawley New Town were produced by the Birmingham-based John Madin Design Group.

The Minister proposed an extension of 12,000 acres (4,900 ha) in 1968 (taking in the historic area of Ironbridge Gorge). The Dawley New Town (Designation) Amendment (Telford) Order was made on 29 November 1968, extending the New Town area by 10,143 acres (4,105 ha) of "land lying within the urban districts of Oakengates and Wellington and the rural districts of Shifnal and Wellington". The Order also renamed the new town Telford, after the Scottish-born civil engineer Thomas Telford, who in 1787 became Surveyor of Public Works for Shropshire. Other suggested names at the time were Dawelloak and Wrekin Forest City.

Most of the infrastructure was constructed from the late 1960s and throughout the 1970s, with the major housing and commercial development occurring over three decades up to the early 1990s when the Development Corporation was wound up to be replaced by the Commission for New Towns, later English Partnerships, and most of the property was handed over to the then Wrekin District Council. Telford was now 25 years old and was firmly established as one of the most important towns in the region. There is a Retail Park called Wrekin Retail Park in Wellington.

In 1983, after fierce opposition and three public enquiries, the M54 motorway was completed, connecting the town to the M6 and thence the rest of the UK's motorway network. Other major roads are the A5, A518 and A442, which is commonly known as the Eastern Primary or EP, and is officially branded Queensway.

Many of the new town's residents were originally from the West Midlands conurbation, which includes Wolverhampton, Birmingham, Dudley and Walsall. A majority of the council house tenants in Telford were rehoused from inner-city Birmingham. The rehousing affected existing communities, who were sometimes resentful of the changes. As a result some individuals still refuse to put Telford in their address, instead using the original local name (such as Wellington or Dawley) and often citing the existence of Town Councils as support for the argument "you can't live in a town in a town", e.g. Wellington (Town) Telford (Town). The new town's residents who arrived in the 1960s and 1970s earned the unwanted nickname 'overspill' from people living in the existing towns and villages.

In 2007, a £250 million regeneration plan for the town centre was announced, which includes the pedestrianisation of the road surrounding the shopping centre and the creation of new cafés, bars and shops which would lead to 1,750 new jobs. The reason for the expansion is that the original 'centre' was only ever a shopping place with no real heart. As the 'centre' closed early in the evening there was no nightlife at all in the area, the only major local entertainment areas being in Oakengates and Wellington.

The first phase of the town-centre development, named Southwater, was completed in 2014. The official opening ceremony, on 18 October 2014, included live music and fireworks. The area includes a refurbished library, various chain restaurants, Cineworld IMAX Cinema, a bowling alley/arcade and a new multi-storey car park.

== Geography ==
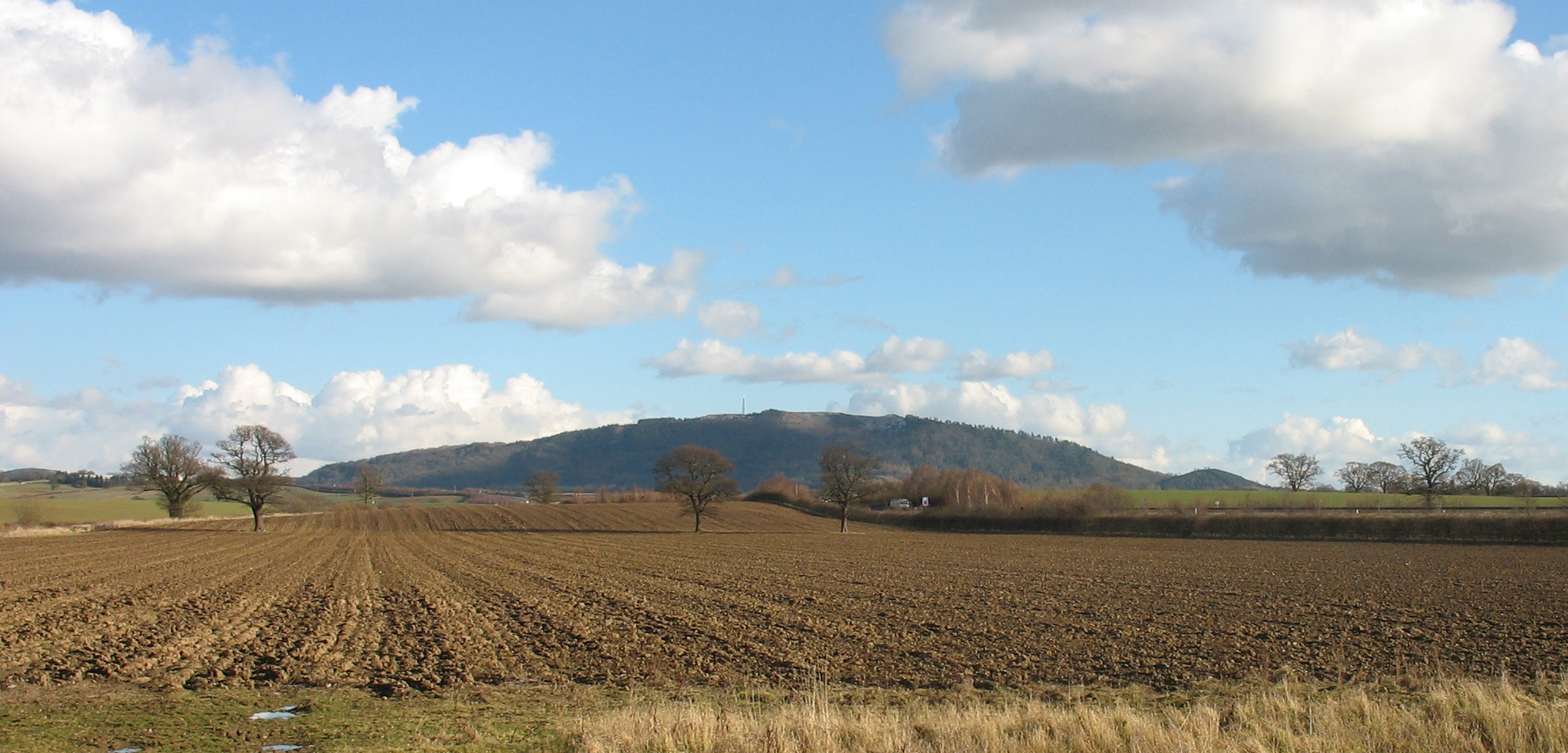
The Wrekin overlooks the town.

Telford town centre lies about 16 miles (26 km) east/south-east of Shrewsbury and 20 miles (32 km) north-west of Wolverhampton. The town covers 7,803 hectares (30.13 square miles) and its southern and eastern parts, between the Severn Gorge and Donnington Wood, include the East Shropshire coalfield. North and north-west Telford lie beyond the coalfield's boundary fault on sandstone beds which, along with other Triassic formations, prevail over much of the North Shropshire plain. The town centre stands on a watershed, with land to the south draining towards the River Severn and to the north sloping gently down towards the Weald Moors. The town is dominated by the Wrekin, a large hill of 407 m (1335 ft), south-west of Wellington, straddling the border with the unitary Shropshire Council (before the latter's creation in 2009 the borough of Shrewsbury and Atcham).

== Governance ==
Ward map; Telford urban area highlighted in orange, within the Telford and Wrekin borough

Within the borough of Telford & Wrekin, the town is entirely parished. Telford has no single town council because of this. The town is also divided into Wards, within the Telford and Wrekin borough. These are used for electoral purposes and demographic surveys. Telford was created politically – but its attempts to make a cohesive town from the fusion of other independent towns: Wellington, Madeley, Hadley, Oakengates, Dawley, Ironbridge and Donnington have largely been successful. Despite this, the town has much clearer divisions than in other older towns, such as nearby Shrewsbury, which have developed into one consolidated urban area over time. Some small settlements to the south such as a part of Ironbridge and Broseley, while part of the Telford Urban Area, are administered by Shropshire Council.

Telford is the only settlement within the Telford parliamentary constituency, which was held by Labour from its creation in 1997 until the 2015 general election. It was then held for the Conservatives by Lucy Allen who stood down ahead of the 2024 general election after defecting to the Reform UK party. The current MP since the election is Shaun Davies (Labour). Some suburbs, such as Wellington, are located in The Wrekin constituency, which also has varying support between the Conservatives and Labour. Conservative Mark Pritchard was reelected as the MP for The Wrekin in 2024, and has now held the seat continuously since 2005. Telford is administratively part of the West Midlands region.

== Demography ==

In 1963 Dawley new town was intended to take 50,000 people from the West Midlands conurbation and so to grow to a town of 70,000 or more. By 1968 Telford was intended to take an additional 50,000 and grow to a town of 220,000 or more by 1991. By 1983, however, Telford's population was just under 108,000, and it was generally thought that it might not reach 120,000 by the late 1980s.

The population of Telford's built-up area was 147,980 according to the 2011 census. At the 2001 census, the urban area had 138,241 people. The built-up area includes Broseley which lies outside the Borough of Telford and Wrekin and also includes the towns of Dawley, Oakengates, Wellington and Madeley.

Telford has a younger than average population, and a higher rate of teenage pregnancy than the national average, as well as relatively high levels of income deprivation with 15% of residents living in low income households. In addition the level of statutorily homeless households in 2004/05 was above average for England. The Telford and Wrekin area is a popular commuter zone, containing some relatively rural areas in the North and West of the borough. These are popular with commuters to the West Midlands conurbation, due to the good transport links provided by the A5/M54.

In 2011, the town was 91.9% white (88.5% White British), 4.7% Asian, 1.2% Black, 1.9% Mixed race and 0.2% other. At the same census the population of the town was 142,723 and had an area of 46.2 kilometers with the population estimated to be 147,105 in 2016.

== Economy ==
Population and Employment
Date	Population	No. of Jobs	% of Jobs on Ind. Estates
1968	74,750	35,671	1.4
1969	76,200	35,710	2.4
1970	78,200	35,948	5.1
1971	80,800	36,191	7.2
1972	84,200	36,743	9.3
1973	87,100	39,861	11.4
1974	89,000	40,928	13.2
1975	90,000	40,986	12.3
1976	93,980	42,036	14.9
1977	97,900	43,637	15.4
1978	100,300	44,681	16.8
1979	102,000	44,247	18.2
1980	104,200	42,397	18.3
1981	104,200	39,414	16.8
1982	106,600	38,852	18.2
1983	107,700	39,037	19.9

During the economic crisis of the late 1960s (with unemployment doubling nationally during the second half of the decade), unemployment in the then-new town was initially high.

However, in 1967 Halesfield Industrial Estate was founded on the south-eastern edge of the town – the first real answer to Telford's unemployment problems. Other large estates followed, in 1973 with Stafford Park just east of the town centre and in 1979 with Hortonwood, to the north, helping ease the unemployment crisis in a decade which saw an almost unbroken rise in unemployment.

In total, half a million square metres of factory space were provided between 1968 and 1983, making Telford an attractive investment area.

By 1976, Telford had begun to recruit industry from the US, Europe, and Japan. The foreign firms required larger factories, and they began to be built at Stafford Park. By 1983 over 2,000 jobs in Telford were provided by around 40 (mostly American) foreign companies. In contrast to industry in the Black Country at the time, these new companies focused on high-technology industries rather than the heavy and metal-finishing industries.

The new arrivals included the American company Unimation and three firms from Japan: Nikon UK Ltd., which opened a warehouse at Halesfield in 1983; video-tape manufacturers Hitachi Maxell at Apley Castle in 1983; and office equipment manufacturers Ricoh, who took a 22-acre (89,000 m^{2}) site for a factory at Priorslee next to the M54, and formed the first in Telford's new enterprise zone.

Consequently, from the later 1970s, Telford began to attract high-technology firms and to diversify its industry, and the promotion of the Service industry also began to prosper, in the Telford Town Centre area. However, a deepening national recession meant that, despite the creation of new jobs, there were net job losses from 1979. Unemployment grew from 3.4 per cent in 1969 to over 8 per cent in 1972 and 22.3 per cent (almost double the national average) in 1983; long-term unemployment rose even faster. Nevertheless, the rate of increase in unemployment was slowing down by 1983 and was making some progress against national and regional trends.

Unemployment in Telford was still around the 20% mark – nearly double the national average at the time – as late as 1986. The Lawson Boom of the next three years saw that figure fall dramatically by the end of the decade, only for it to rise to a similarly high figure again by 1992 as a result of the early 1990s recession. In later years the local economy has matured, the median gross weekly earnings for full-time workers who work in Telford and Wrekin was £563 in 2019 (West Midlands £552.50 and England £591.40).

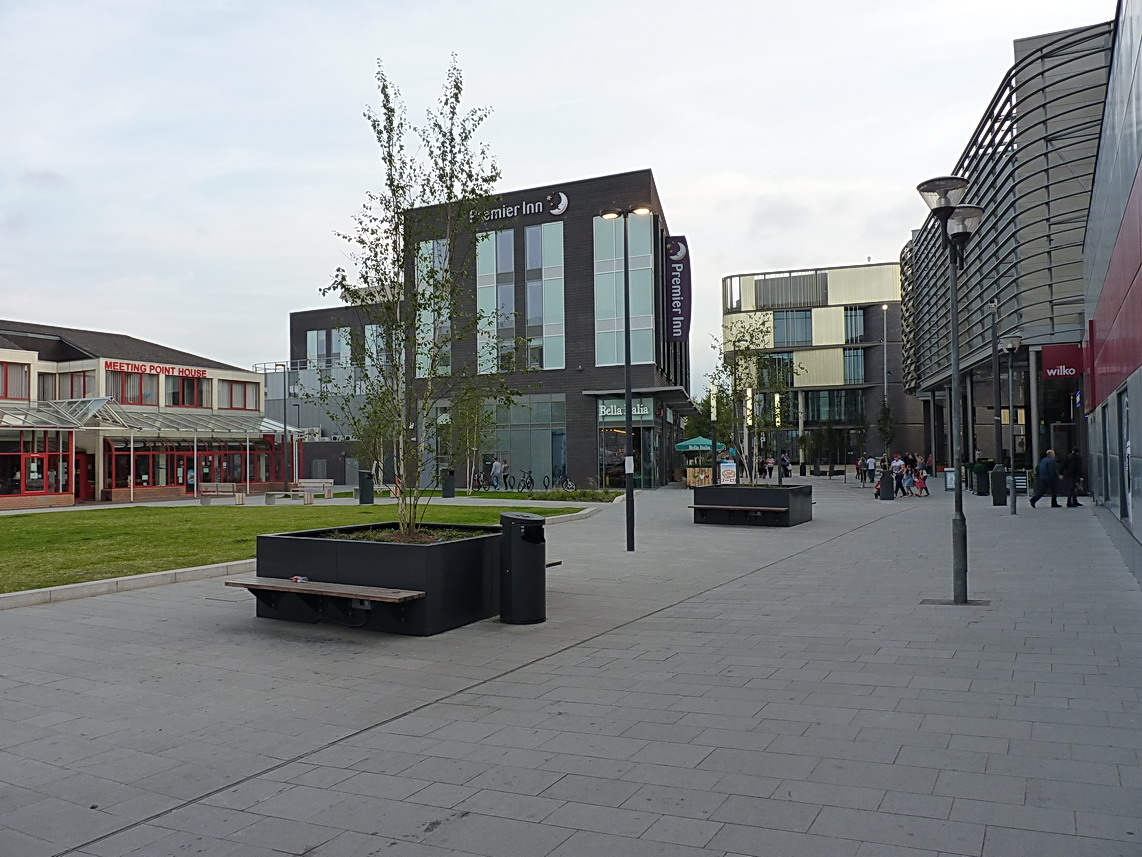
The 2014 Southwater development just south of the shopping centre

Telford has attracted several large IT services companies, including EDS who support the MOD contract from the Euston Park site, as well as a vast array of clients across the world from the Plaza building. Also Capgemini and Fujitsu employ a significant number of staff in the area, mainly supporting their governmental client, HM Revenue & Customs (HMRC). The expansion in these job sectors provided a great asset to Telford's economic recovery after 1992. By August 2007, the success story of Telford's economy had seen unemployment shrink to 3.3% – a fraction of its peak 15 years earlier.

However, the subsequent recession meant that unemployment in the area had risen to 5% by February 2011, although this was still well below the national average.

The Shropshire Star evening newspaper was based in Ketley. There is a free local paper the Telford Journal which is also published by the Shropshire Star. However, the building was demolished in 2023, and moved to Telford Town Centre.

There have been job losses, with the movement of 500 Defence Logistics Organisation (DLO) jobs at the MoD base at Sapphire House, Telford town centre, to Bristol. The sugar beet factory at Allscott closed in 2007.

In 2019 a joint venture called Rheinmetall BAE Systems Land installed itself in Telford, not far from Babcock DSG. Together they are responsible for the Challenger 2 Life Extension Project.

== Settlements ==
=== Southern Telford ===
Aqueduct, Brookside, Dawley Bank, Doseley, Hollinswood, Heath Hill, Horsehay, Lightmoor, Little Dawley, Malinslee, Randlay, Stirchley, Sutton Hill, Tweedale, Woodside.

=== Northern Telford ===
Arleston, Donnington, Donnington Wood, Hadley, Hartshill, Haybridge, Ketley, Ketley Bank, Ketleybrook, Ketleyhill, Lawley, Lawley Bank, Leegomery, Muxton, Newdale, Old Park, Overdale, Priorslee, Red Lake, Snedshill, St Georges, The Rock, Trench, Trench Lock, Wombridge, Wrockwardine Wood.

=== Surrounding subtowns and villages ===
Surrounding subtowns and villages include Blists Hill, Coalbrookdale, Coalport, Dawley, Ironbridge, Jackfield, Little Wenlock, Madeley, Newport, Oakengates, Wellington, Admaston, Bratton, Dothill and Shawbirch.

=== Industrial areas ===
Hadley Castle, Halesfield, Hortonwood, Stafford Park

== Landmarks ==
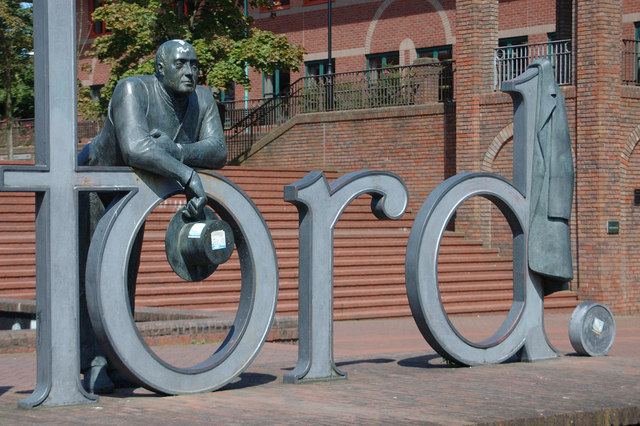
Thomas Telford statue in the town centre, by the Law Courts

The commercial centre of the town is Telford Town Centre, located off Junction 5 of the M54 motorway, completed in the 1980s. It is home to the administrative headquarters of Telford & Wrekin Council, which are now based at Addenbrook House on Ironmasters Way, after moving from the old Civic Offices (dating from the mid-1970s) in December 2012. The large Telford Shopping Centre (and the accompanying Town Park), various office blocks, such as the blue office towers (Telford Plaza), and the Windsor Life building. The Forge retail park and a large Odeon Cinema are also located in the area. Telford also houses one of the Midlands' few ice skating rinks near the Telford International Centre (TIC). The TIC comprises a number of exhibition halls and event spaces. It holds parties, conferences, concerts and was formerly the venue of the UK Snooker Championship.

A major Shropshire landmark, also now part of Telford, is The Iron Bridge, located in Ironbridge. It was the first bridge of its size in the world made out of cast iron. In the same area is the Ironbridge Gorge, a UNESCO World Heritage Site. The most important landmark in the area is The Wrekin hill. There is also the Lilleshall Monument erected on Lilleshall Hill to the north-east, to the 1st Duke of Sutherland.

== Education ==
Telford has a number of primary and secondary schools. These range from academies such as the Telford Langley School to City Technology Colleges like the Thomas Telford School. 8 miles (13 km) to the north are Adams' Grammar School and Newport Girls High School selective schools located in nearby Newport. Wrekin College, an independent co-educational boarding and day school, is located in the Wellington area of Telford.

Further education was handled by Telford College of Arts and Technology (TCAT) and Telford New College, a sixth-form college located in Wellington. In September 2017 the two colleges merged to form Telford College. There are four other sixth forms located at Haberdashers' Abraham Darby, Holy Trinity Academy, Madeley Academy and Thomas Telford School.

Telford is home to Harper Adams University digital skills hub, based at The Quad. Specialising in food, animal and sustainable education, the university's main campus is also located 9.5 miles to the northeast at Edgmond, near Newport.

== Media ==
Local news and television programmes are provided by BBC West Midlands and ITV Central. Local radio stations are BBC Radio Shropshire, Hits Radio Black Country & Shropshire, Greatest Hits Radio Black Country & Shropshire and Capital North West & Wales. The Shropshire Star is the town's local weekly newspaper.

== Transport ==
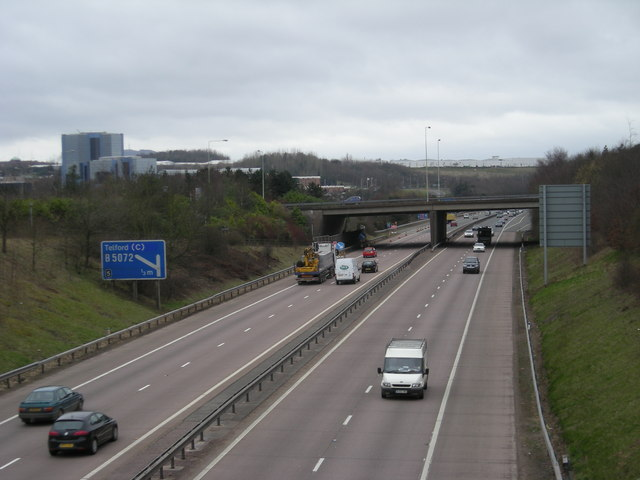
The M54 shown here near Junction 5 for Telford Centre, which is visible in the background to the left

Telford is situated at the terminus of the M54 motorway, a spur of the M6 linking the town with Wolverhampton and the West Midlands, and on the A5 road between Shrewsbury and Cannock.

Telford Central railway station is situated on the Shrewsbury to Wolverhampton Line. The town also has Oakengates railway station and Wellington railway station on the same line. All three stations are serviced by trains from Transport for Wales Rail and West Midlands Railway.

In May 1998, Virgin Trains West Coast introduced a service from Shrewsbury to London Euston. It was withdrawn in 2000. A service to Walsall was introduced from Wellington via Wolverhampton but proved to be unprofitable and was withdrawn by London Midland in December 2008. A new service from Wrexham General to London Marylebone was launched by Wrexham & Shropshire in 2008. The venture however proved unprofitable and ceased to operate on 28 January 2011, leaving Shropshire as the only English county without a direct train link to London. Virgin Trains re-launched a direct Shrewsbury to London Euston service in December 2014. In addition, there are three further stations isolated from the national network, Spring Village, Lawley and Horsehay & Dawley, at Telford Steam Railway, situated at Horsehay.

Telford's rapidly growing population still has a relatively low car ownership. In 2004 Telford & Wrekin council was awarded 'Beacon Status' for improving access to public transport. Being a new town with a planned transport infrastructure, the town features relatively few traffic problems, in comparison to the urban areas of Birmingham or medieval streets of Shrewsbury. The M54 reduces through-traffic on local roads, and the A442 Queensway acts as a north–south artery road.

The majority of bus services in the area are operated by Arriva Midlands from its garage at Stafford Park, which replaced the original Midland Red garage in Wellington. Banga Bus operate service 891 to Wolverhampton via Shifnal and Tettenhall, replacing the original service operated by Midland Red which was latterly operated by Arriva Midlands. Between 1 June 2021 and January 2022, Chaserider launched service X14 to Cannock and the McArthur Glenn West Midlands Designer Outlet. but was withdrawn due to low usage.

A number of council contract services operate under the 'Travel Telford' brand, including Arriva Midlands service 99, Chaserider services 100, 102, 103 and 104 and Select Bus service 101. These were introduced to link local employment opportunities, schools and villages previously without bus services. Notably the 100 (nicknamed 'Express 100') runs seven days a week and on evenings.

== Notable people ==
=== Public service ===
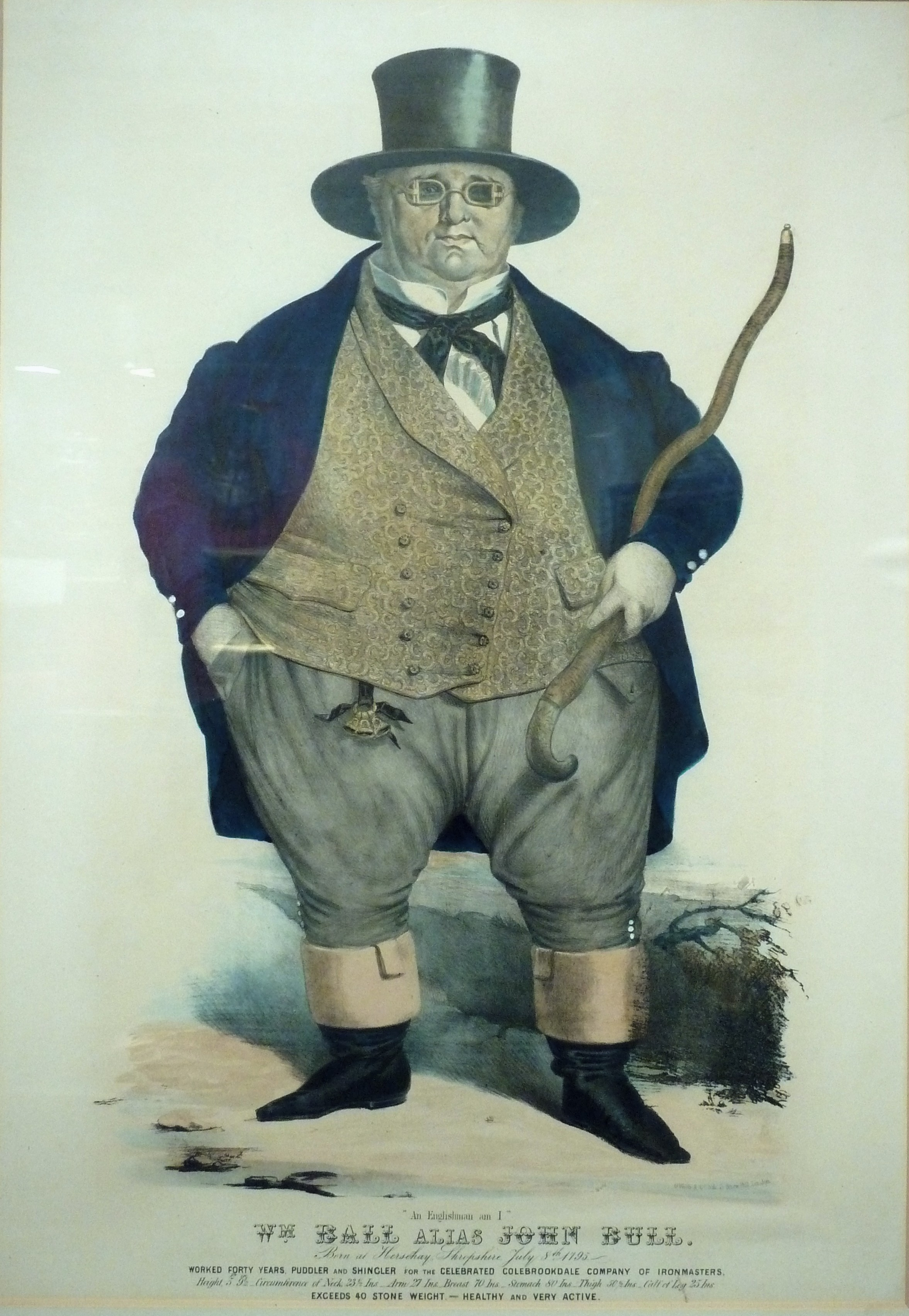
A lithographic print of William Ball

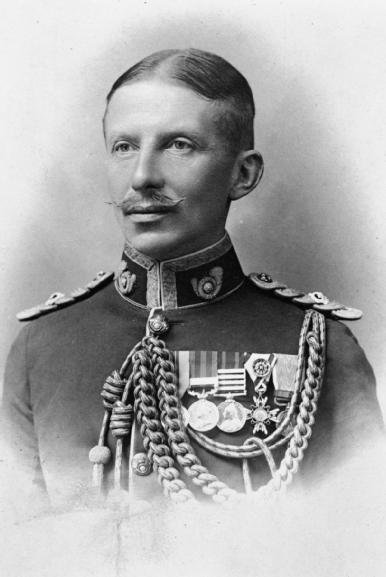
Charles Allix Lavington Yate VC, 1914

- William Forester (1655–1718), Whig politician who accompanied King William III to England at the beginning of the Glorious Revolution. Was born and lived in Wellington.
- Samuel Peploe (1667–1752), Bishop of Chester between 1726 and 1752, was baptized in Dawley.
- Sir George Downing, 3rd Baronet (1685–1749), Whig politician, founded Downing College, Cambridge, was brought up at Dothill.
- Richard Padmore (1789 in Wellington – 1881), Liberal politician and industrialist
- William Ball (1795 in Horsehay – 1852), an iron puddler believed to be the heaviest man in England while he was alive. Weighing approximately 40 stone, Ball was exhibited around the country as the "largest man in Britain".
- Major Charles Allix Lavington Yate (1872–1914), Army officer, recipient of the Victoria Cross for action in WW1, grew up in Madeley
- Sir Joseph Simpson (1909 in Dawley – 1968), Commissioner of Police of the Metropolis, from 1958 to 1968
- Len Murray (1922 in Hadley – 2004), General Secretary of the Trades Union Congress 1973 to 1984.
- Jeremy Corbyn (born 1949), Leader of the Labour Party, 2015/2020, grew up at Pave Lane and educated at Adams Grammar School,
- Professor Stephen Molyneux (born 1955), English educational technologist and Mayor of Oakengates between 2003 and 2007, resided in Telford between 1991 and 2018.
- David Wright (born 1966 in Oakengates), Member of Parliament for Telford between 2001 and 2015
- Kim Hughes (born 1979), a British Army bomb disposal expert, particularly in the Afghanistan conflict, went to Thomas Telford School.

=== Acting & writing ===
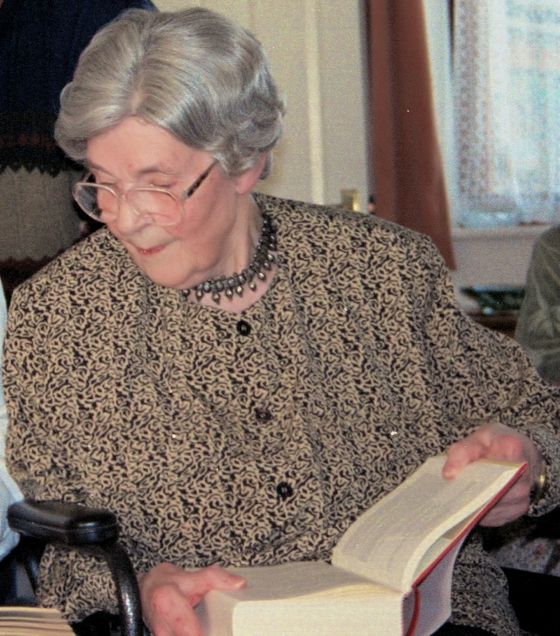
Edith Pargeter aka Ellis Peters, 1995

- Hesba Stretton (1832 in Wellington – 1911) an English writer of children's books
- Wyke Bayliss (1835 in Madeley – 1906) a British poet, author, and painter
- Samuel Parkes Cadman (1864 in Ketley – 1936), American clergyman, newspaper writer, and pioneer Christian radio broadcaster of the 1920s and 1930s based in New York
- Edith Pargeter (1913 in Horsehay – 1995 in Madeley) nom de plume Ellis Peters, was an English author especially of history and historical fiction
- Norman Jones (1932 in Donnington – 2013) an English actor, primarily on TV.
- Stewart Lee (born 1968 in Wellington) an English stand-up comedian, writer and director
- Paul Blackthorne (born 1969 in Wellington) actor, plays Detective Lance in the DC TV series Arrow
- Anna Richardson (born 1970 in Wellington) is an English television presenter, writer and journalist.
- Christian Brassington (born 1983 in Wellington) a film and television actor.
- Arianna B (born 2000 in Wellington).

=== Music ===
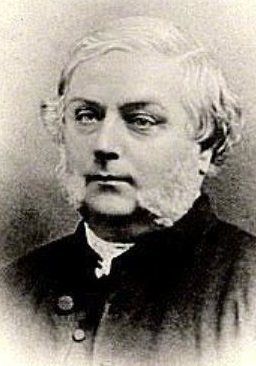
Henry Gauntlett

- Henry Gauntlett (1805 in Wellington – 1876), an English organist and hymnwriter.
- Nigel Rogers (1935 in Wellington – 2022), an English opera singer, multilingual tenor and music conductor
- Raymond Froggatt (1941–2023), an English songwriter and singer, lived in Telford
- Steve Beresford (born 1950 in Wellington), an English musician
- Stephen Jones (born 1962), an English musician and novelist who fronted Indie Band Babybird
- T'Pau (formed 1986), a British pop group whose members are from Wellington and Shrewsbury.
- Cancer (formed in 1988), a death metal band from Ironbridge.
- The Sunshine Underground (years active 2000–2016), an alternative dance band, originally from Telford and Shrewsbury, formed while studying at New College Telford.
- David Brown (born 1987) is a British YouTuber and musician known as Boyinaband

=== Science ===
- William Withering (1741 in Wellington – 1799), an English botanist, geologist, chemist, physician, first systematic investigator of the bioactivity of digitalis, and member of the Lunar Society
- Thomas Campbell Eyton (1809–1880) English naturalist and friend of Charles Darwin. Was born in Eyton Hall near Wellington.
- Dr Jacob Noel-Storr (born 1976 in Telford) English astrophysics scientist

=== Sport ===
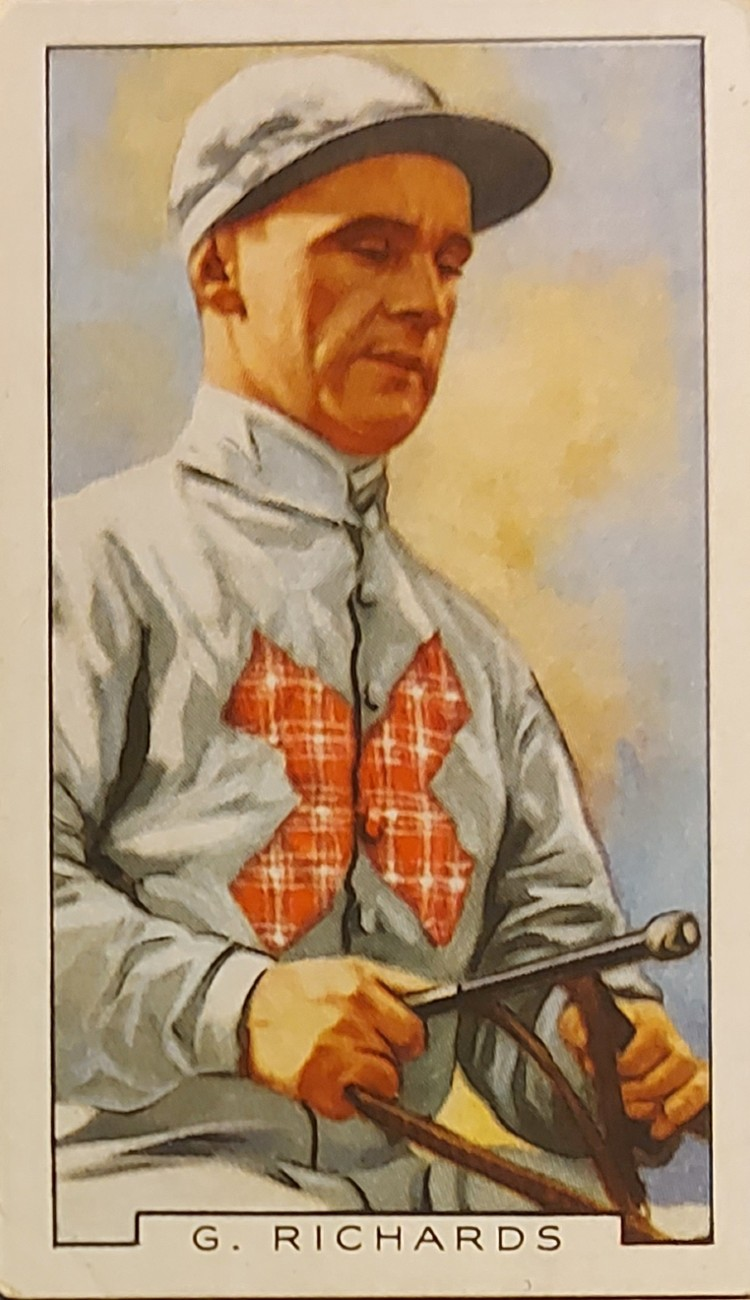
Gordon Richards, 1938

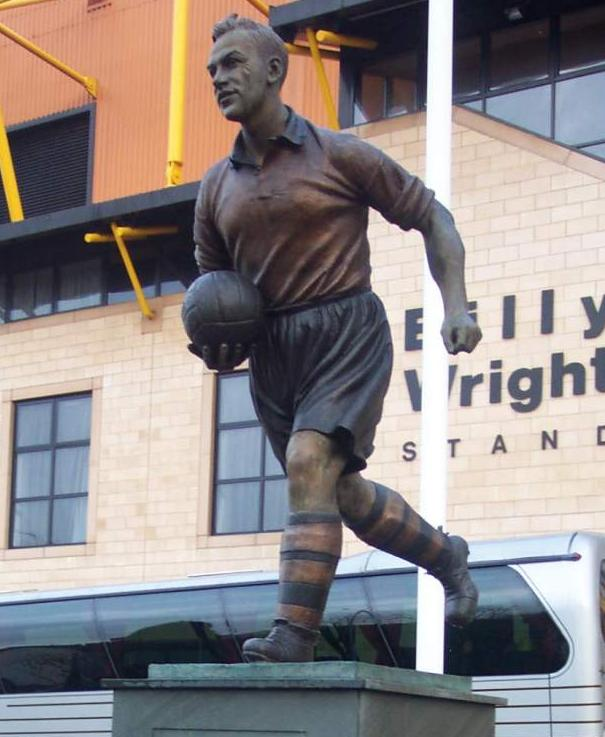
Billy Wright, statue outside Molineux Stadium

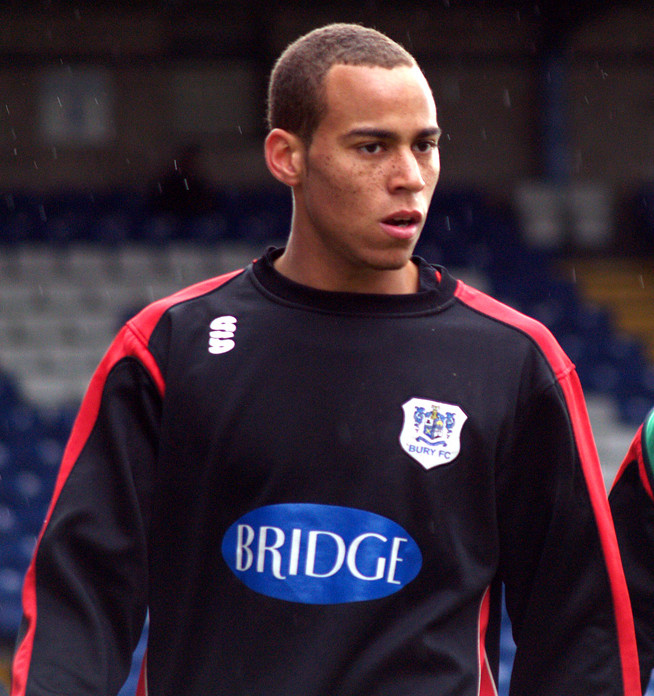
Elliott Bennett, 2009

- Enoch Tranter (1842 in Old Park – 1910 in Donnington Wood) an English cricketer and coal miner
- Matthew Webb (1848 in Dawley – 1883) the first recorded person to swim the English Channel unaided
- William Dyas (1872-1940), first-class cricketer, local politician and businessman, lived lifelong in Madeley.
- William Foulke (1874 in Dawley – 1916) football goalkeeper, played 355 games
- Will Osborne (1875-1942 in Oakengates) Welsh rugby international, settled in Oakengates on retirement
- Joe Butler (1879 in Dawley Bank – 1941) football goalkeeper who made 513 appearances
- Sir Gordon Richards (1904 in Donnington Wood – 1986) won a record 26 champion jockey titles, and was the only flat jockey to be knighted
- Ernie Clements (1922 in Hadley – 2006) an English road racing cyclist, frame builder and cycle shop owner
- Billy Wright (1924 in Ironbridge – 1994) professional English footballer who played 490 games for Wolverhampton Wanderers, also the first footballer to earn 100 international caps.
- Johnny Elliot (1931–2015), Jamaican Olympic boxer who lived in Telford.
- Darshan Singh Kullar (born 1938), Indian retired hockey player, gold medallist at 1964 Summer Olympics.
- David Ottley (born 1955) retired javelin thrower, silver medallist at the 1984 Summer Olympics; lived in Telford
- John Pender (born 1963), footballer played 496 games, mainly for Wolves and Burnley, lives in Telford.
- Mark Elliot (born 1966 in Wellington) Olympic welterweight boxer
- Ted Hankey (born 1968) professional darts player, resides in Telford
- Richie Woodhall (born 1968) light-middleweight boxer bronze medallist at the 1988 Summer Olympics, former WBC super middleweight champion, grew up in Woodside, Telford.
- Rob Edwards (born 1982) former footballer, played 213 games, and 15 for Wales.
- Ricky Balshaw (born 1986) para equestrian rider, competed in the Beijing 2008 Paralympics; lives in Telford
- Tom Carlon (born 1987 in Telford) an English professional ice hockey player
- Josh Crutchley (born 1987) a British professional basketball player, grew up in Telford
- Danny Guthrie (born 1987) professional footballer, played 322 games attended Thomas Telford School
- Elliott Bennett (born 1988) footballer, played over 500 games grew up in Telford, plays for Shrewsbury Town.
- Lee Collins (1988 in Telford – 2021) footballer, played 408 games
- Kyle Bennett (born 1990) footballer, played over 400 games, plays for Bristol Rovers.
- Mickey Bushell (born 1990) is a Paralympic gold medalist, lives in Telford
- Kelly Edwards (born 1990) a British judoka from Telford.
- Connor Goldson (born 1992) footballer, played over 340 games; attended Thomas Telford School.
- Liam Davies (born 1996 in Donnington) WBC super bantamweight boxer.
- Ryan Giles (born 2000 in St Georges) footballer, played 170 games
- Penny Healey (born 2005 in Telford), archer

== Sport ==
Telford is home to a variety of established amateur, semi-pro and professional sports clubs.

The town was represented by Telford United F.C. between 1969 and 2004. Following financial difficulties, the club folded in 2004 and was reformed in the same year as AFC Telford United. Between 2004 and 2020, AFC Telford United's home ground, the New Bucks Head, was used as the venue for home matches played by the under-23 team of Wolverhampton Wanderers F.C. AFC Telford United have won the Shropshire Senior Cup on three occasions in 2009, 2014, and 2017. They won promotion to Conference North in 2007, beating Witton Albion 3–1 in the play-offs. In 2009 they won the Setanta Shield Trophy, beating Forest Green Rovers 3-0 on penalties. AFC Telford United currently play in the national league north after winning the southern central division playoffs against Kettering townthe Telford has a Supporters Club following Wolverhampton Wanderers F.C., organising travel to away games and hosting social functions. Other local non league football clubs have begun gaining local support with Shifnal Town, Allscott Heath and Telford Town all attracting significant investment in recent times.

Ice hockey in the town is represented by the Telford Tigers, an English Premier Ice Hockey League (EPL or EPIHL) team originally formed in 1985. Telford Titans, an ENL Team, had represented development hockey in the town from 2008 however it folded in 2014.

Ice racing first came to the Telford Ice Skating Rink in February 1986 with the Skoal Bandits Trophy being won by Hans Nielsen. In November of the same year Jan Andersson won the Ice International Trophy and retained the trophy at the next event in 1988. In 1989 the British Open Championship was held and continued every year until 2008. The competition returned in 2011 and 2012. After this time ice racing at Telford discontinued.

American football teams in the town include Shropshire Revolution, Wrekin Giants (1985–1989), Shropshire Giants (1989), and Cannock Chase Giants (1989-1993/4).

Telford Raiders are the town's rugby league club, although there have been other rugby league clubs in Telford historically, such as the Telford All Blacks and Shropshire Scorpions. Telford Hornets represent the town at rugby union.

Shropshire Warriors Basketball Club play at Telford College of Art and Technology (TCAT).

The Telford International Centre hosted the UK Snooker Championship from 2007 to 2010. The championship moved from York in 2007 but returned to the refurbished Barbican Centre in York since 2011.

Telford is home to four golf courses. The Shropshire Golf Centre is located near Muxton, in the northeast of Telford. Other courses in Telford include Horsehay Village Golf Club, in Horsehay, The Wrekin Golf Club, in Wellington, and Telford Golf and Country Club, in Madeley.

There are a number of cricket clubs within Telford competing in local leagues. Both Wellington Cricket Club and Madeley Cricket Club currently play in the Premier Division of the Shropshire County Cricket League whilst St. George's Cricket Club play in Division One of the Shropshire County Cricket League. Shropshire County Cricket Club often play at Orleton Park in Wellington and St George's Cricket Ground in St. George's.
