= Charles Allix Lavington Yate =

English British Army officer and recipient of the Victoria Cross

Charles Allix Lavington Yate VC
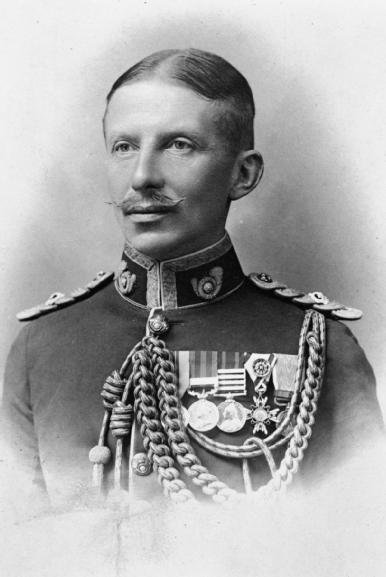
- Born: 14 March 1872; Ludwigslust, Grand Duchy of Mecklenburg-Schwerin, Germany
- Died: 20 September 1914 (aged 42); Torgau POW camp, Kingdom of Prussia, Germany
- Burial place: Stahnsdorf, Berlin, Germany
- Relatives: Sir Charles Yate, 1st Baronet (cousin)
- Military career
- Allegiance: United Kingdom
- Branch: British Army
- Service years: 1892 – 1914
- Rank: Major
- Units: The King's Own Yorkshire Light Infantry
- Conflicts: Tirah Campaign; Second Boer War; First World War
- Awards: Victoria Cross

Major Charles Allix Lavington Yate, VC (14 March 1872 – 20 September 1914) was an English British Army officer and recipient of the Victoria Cross, the highest and most prestigious award for gallantry in the face of the enemy that can be awarded to British and Commonwealth forces.

Yate, from Madeley, Shropshire, attended the Royal Military College, Sandhurst, and joined the British Army. He saw service in British India, Mauritius, South Africa during the Second Boer War, as an observer during the Russo-Japanese War, and between 1908 and 1914 he was on the staff of the War Office in London.

== Early life ==
Yate was born in his mother's home town of Ludwigslust on 14 March 1872 to the Reverend Prebendary George Edward Yate (1825–1908), vicar of St Michael's Church, Madeley from 1859 to 1908, and his German second wife Luise Caroline Georgine Adolphine Henriette, née Petersen. His cousin was Sir Charles Yate, 1st Baronet.

He was educated at Weymouth College, and graduated from the Royal Military College, Sandhurst, 9th out of 1,100 cadets. He joined the 2nd Battalion, the King's Own Yorkshire Light Infantry as a second lieutenant on 13 August 1892, while it was stationed in Bombay. Promoted to lieutenant on 7 January 1894, he first saw action in India in the Tirah expedition from 1897 to 1898, for which he was awarded the medal and clasp of the Tirah Expedition. He was promoted to captain on 26 July 1899, and with his battalion was transferred to South Africa following the outbreak of the Second Boer War in October that year. The battalion took part in the battles of Belmont and Enslin in November 1899, where Yate was seriously wounded. After the war ended in June 1902, he was briefly a staff officer for requisitions from September 1902, then transferred with the battalion to Malta, leaving Point Natal on the SS Staffordshire in October.

In late 1903, he was seconded as an observer in the Japanese Army, and stayed there during the Russo-Japanese War in 1905. Between 1908 and 1914 he was on the staff of the War Office in London. He was promoted to the rank of major in 1912.

Yate was fluent in French, German and Japanese, and could also speak Hindustani and Persian. He was a keen player of football and polo, a rider with the Albrighton Hunt, and enjoyed skiing. He had contributed unsigned articles to Blackwood's Magazine.

== VC action ==
Yate was 42 years old, and a major in the 2nd Battalion, The King's Own Yorkshire Light Infantry, during the First World War when the following deed took place during the battle of Le Cateau for which he was awarded the VC.

On 26 August 1914 at Le Cateau, France, Major Yate commanded one of the two companies that remained to the end in the trenches, and when all other officers had been killed or wounded and ammunition exhausted, he led his 19 survivors against the enemy in a charge.

He was captured by the Germans and interned in Torgau prisoner of war camp. After repeated attempts, he escaped a month later on 19 September 1914, but was quickly apprehended by local factory workers who suspected his appearance, and cut his own throat to avoid recapture and possible execution as a spy. He died on 20 September 1914.

Four other VCs were won that day at Le Cateau, including one by Lance Corporal Frederick William Holmes, who wrote of Yate: Major Yate was a thorough gentleman and a great favourite with us all. He had had a lot of experience in the Far East and at home, and I am sure that if he had lived he would have become a general. He was always in front, and his constant cry was "Follow me!"

Yate is buried in grave II. G. 8. at the Commonwealth War Graves Commission Berlin South-Western Cemetery in Stahnsdorf, near Potsdam, Germany. He is also listed on the parish war memorial, now on The Green, at Madeley, and within St Michael's Church, Madeley.

== The medal ==
His Victoria Cross is displayed at the King's Own Yorkshire Light Infantry Museum in the Doncaster Museum, England.

== Family ==
On 17 September 1903 he married at St George's Church, Hanover Square, London, Florence Helena Brigg, from Greenhead Hall, Yorkshire. There were no children.

== Bibliography ==
- Gliddon, Gerald (2011) [1994]. 1914. VCs of the First World War. The History Press. ISBN 978-0752459080.
