= Lawley, Shropshire =

Village in Shropshire, England

Coordinates: 52.671672°N 2.484724°W

Lawley
- Village
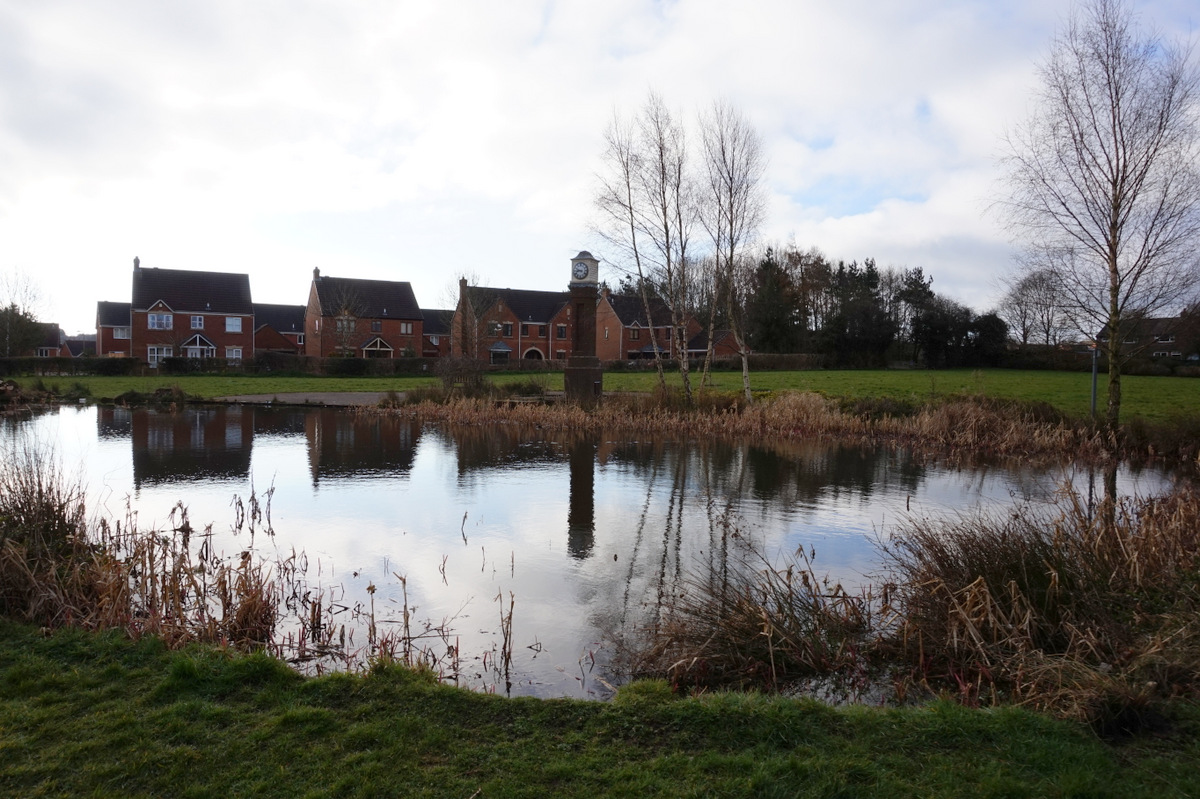
- Lawley

- Location within Shropshire
- OS grid reference: SJ668086
- Civil parish: Lawley and Overdale
- Unitary authority: Telford and Wrekin
- Ceremonial county: Shropshire
- Region: West Midlands
- Country: England
- Sovereign state: United Kingdom
- Post town: TELFORD
- Postcode district: TF4
- Dialling code: 01952
- Police: West Mercia
- Fire: Shropshire
- Ambulance: West Midlands
- UK Parliament: Telford

Lawley is a large village, former township and suburb of Telford in the borough of Telford and Wrekin in Shropshire, England. It is located northwest of the town of Dawley and northwest of the town of Telford. It is part of the civil parish of Lawley and Overdale.

== History ==
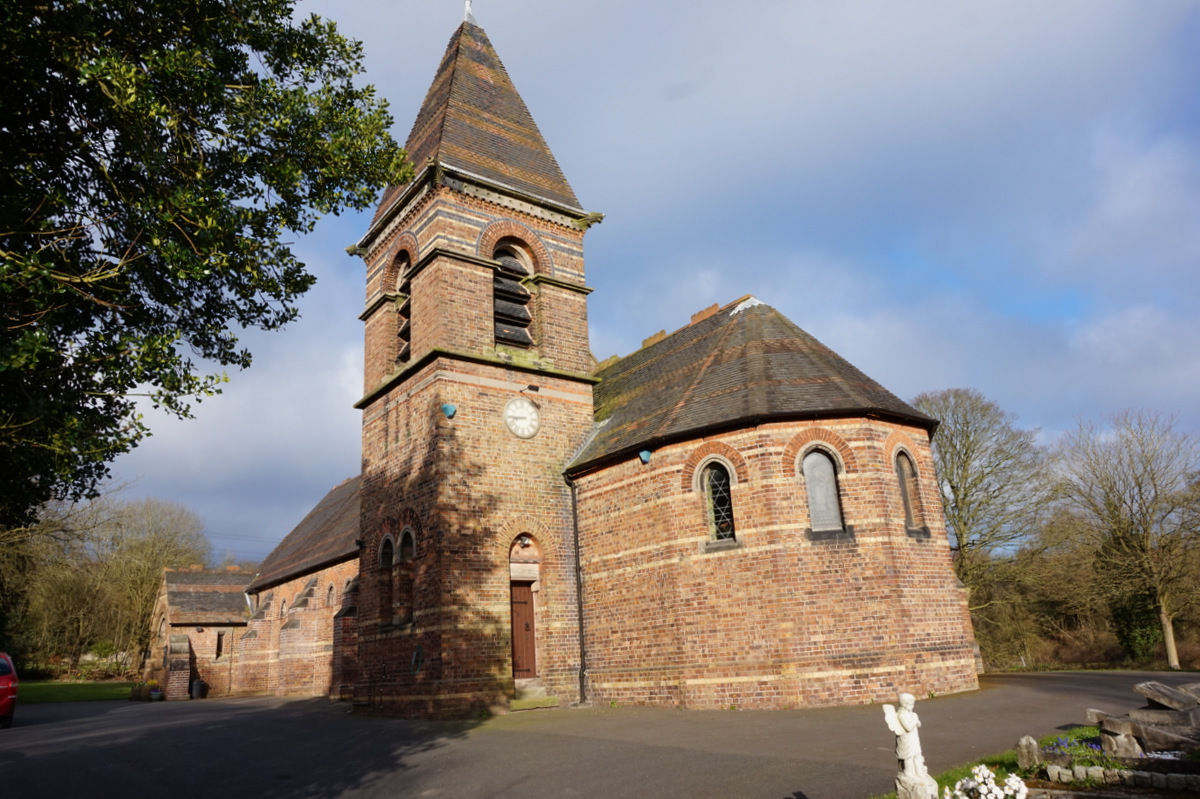
St Johns Church, an active parish church and a Grade II listed building.

In 1843 Lawley was a separate township. The village later became part of the Dawley New Town in 1963, which later became Telford.

== Amenities ==
Most of the villages amenities are located on Birchfield Way. The parish church of St John, built 1865, is on Dawley Road and is a Grade II listed building. The Telford Steam Railway operate along part of the former Wellington to Craven Arms Railway, with its northern terminus at Lawley Village.

== Transport ==
There are regular buses through the village between Telford, Shrewsbury and Madeley. As well as to Bridgnorth, Wellington, Dawley and Oakengates. The village was also formerly served by the Wellington to Craven Arms Railway with a railway station on Station Road in nearby village of Lawley Bank. This is now occupied by housing estates.
