= Lawley and Overdale =

Civil parish in Shropshire, England

Coordinates: 52.677°N 2.474°W

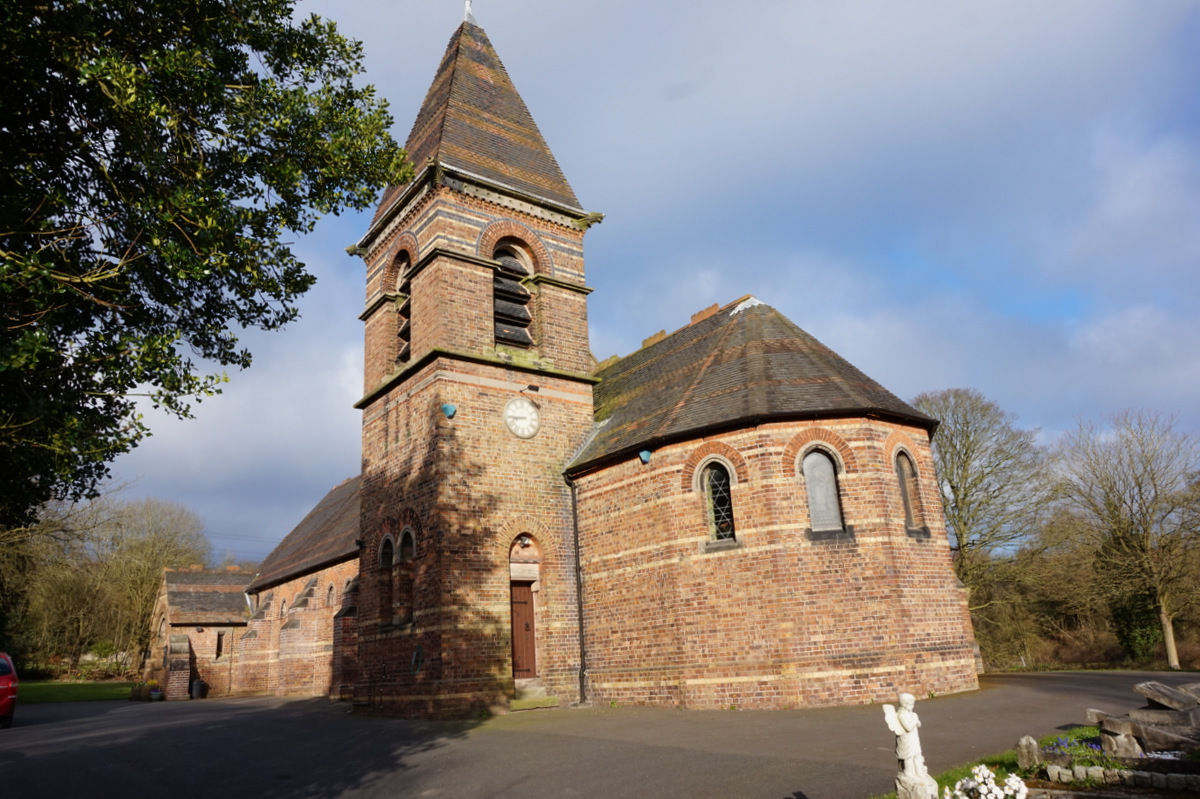
- St John's Church, Lawley

- Location within Shropshire
- Area: 5.555 km^{2} (2.145 sq mi)
- Population: 12,173 (2021 census)
  - Density: 2,191/km^{2} (5,670/sq mi)
- Civil parish: Lawley and Overdale
- Unitary authority: Telford and Wrekin
- Ceremonial county: Shropshire
- Region: West Midlands
- Country: England
- Sovereign state: United Kingdom
- Police: West Mercia
- Fire: Shropshire
- Ambulance: West Midlands
- Website: https://lawleyoverdale-pc.gov.uk/

Lawley and Overdale is a civil parish in Telford and Wrekin unitary area, in the ceremonial county of Shropshire, England.

The parish includes an area of central and western Telford, south of the M54 motorway. Places in the parish are Lawley, Overdale, The Rock, Old Park, and Newdale. In 2021 the parish had a population of 12,173. The parish was formed on 1 April 1988.

It has a parish council, the lowest level of local government in England. There are eight councillors, elected to represent Lawley Common ward (1 councillor), Lawley East ward (3), Lawley West ward (1), Overdale and The Rock ward (2) and Town Centre ward (1).

As of 2024 there are three listed buildings in Lawley and Overdale, all listed at grade II.

== See also ==
- Listed buildings in Lawley and Overdale
