= Malinslee =

Area in Telford, Shropshire, England

Coordinates: 52.672°N 2.458°W

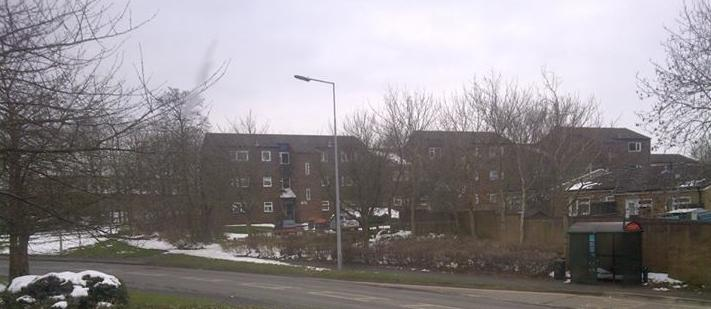
Malinslee with snow fall, April 2013

Malinslee is an estate in the towns of Dawley and Telford in the Telford and Wrekin borough of Shropshire, England. It is near the Town Park and Telford Shopping Centre.

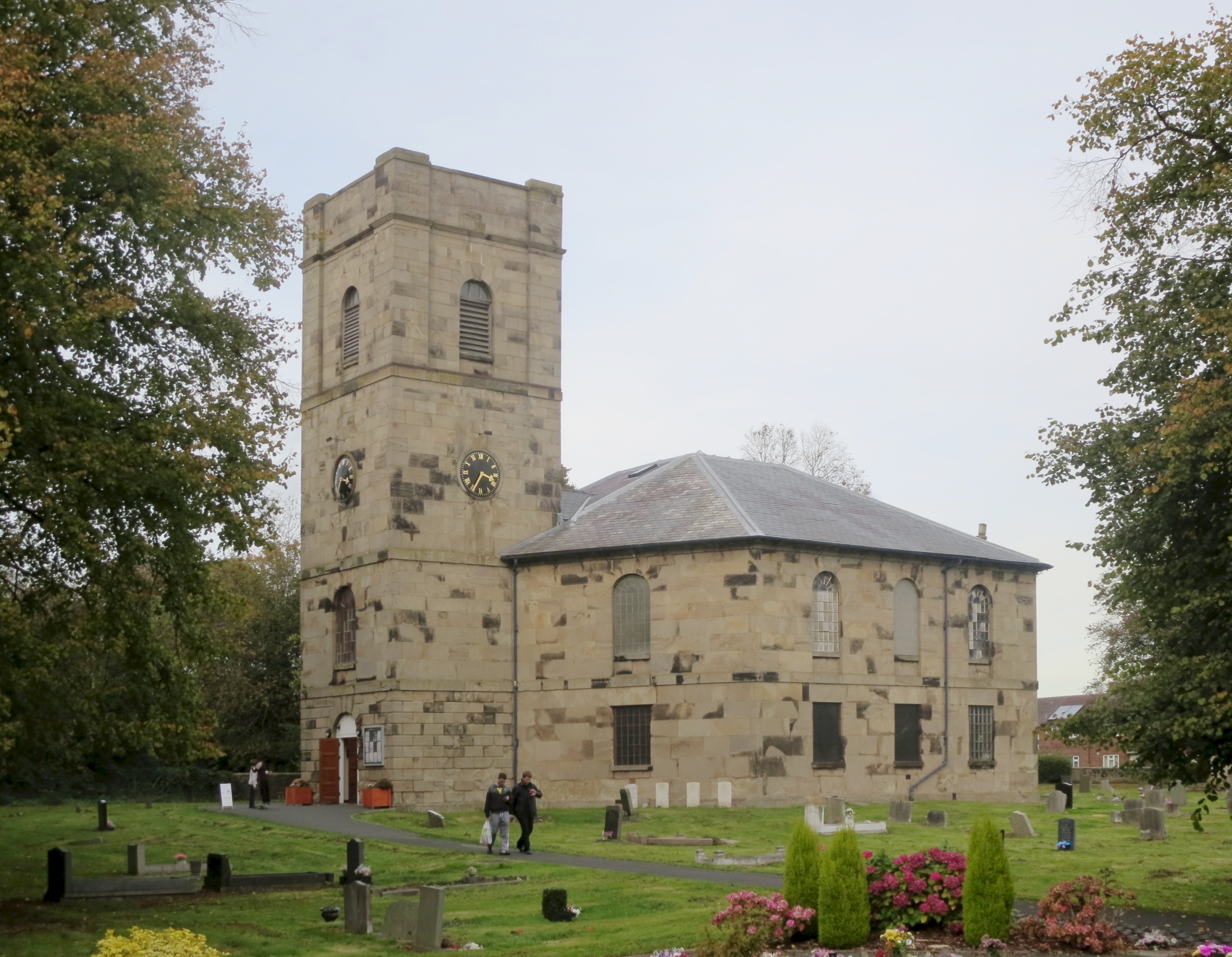
St Leonard's was designed by Thomas Telford in 1805

== History ==
Malinslee was formerly served by the Coalport branch line which ran from Hadley station to Coalport East. Malins Lee station opened in 1860 and closed in 1952, and the trackbed and station site have been built over.

Formerly it had a pub, the Shropshire Lad which also had a bowling green, but this was demolished to make way for a new school and new shops.

The estate had a Youth Centre, near the church; this was subject to much vandalism and was demolished in the early 2000s.

== Schools ==
The earlier schools were St. Leonard's Primary School and Langley Junior School, which were demolished to make way for a new school called Old Park School. Malinslee Junior School was demolished to make way for housing.

== Amenities ==
The estate has a playground, a doctor's surgery, some shops, a fish and chip shop and a hairdresser.

It has a Grade II* listed church called St. Leonard's which was designed by Thomas Telford in 1805. Local coalowner and landowner Isaac Hawkins Browne supported a Sunday School at Malinslee from 1799, and organised the building of the church. This was intended to replace the parish church at Dawley, but that was opened in 1818.

Malinslee has its own playing fields called 'The Church Wickets'. In the past these were full of football goal posts and every Sunday usually saw Sunday League games, both adult and junior. In recent years the fields have had the goal posts removed, now they are mainly used for people to walk dogs etc. A BMX course was created at the side of the fields as well as a small playground.

Malinslee used to have a junior and youth football team called Malinslee Colts – run by Ray Askew a Shropshire FA member – in the 1990s. They played at the old Malinslee School and also at the Church Wickets. They renamed as Dawley Youth when they moved elsewhere within Dawley and stopped playing later in that decade.

== Notable residents ==
Former WBC super middleweight boxing title holder Richie Woodhall lived on the estate in his younger years.

== See also ==
- Listed buildings in Great Dawley
