= Malins Lee railway station =

Disused railway station in Shropshire, England

Malins Lee
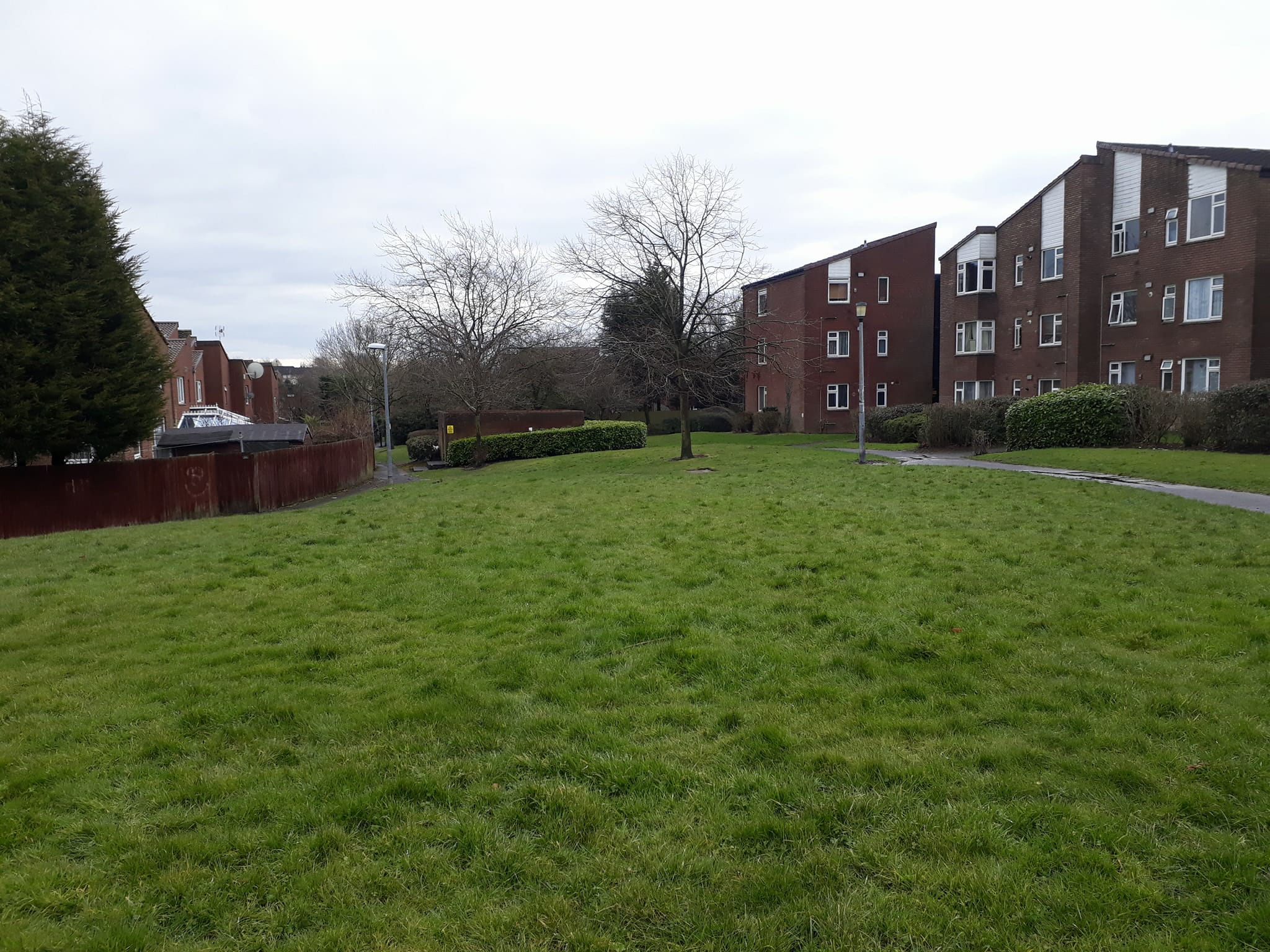
- Malins Lee station site in 2018

General information
- Location: Malinslee, Shropshire; England
- Coordinates: 52.6747°N 2.4401°W
- Grid reference: SJ695085
- Platforms: 1

Other information
- Status: Disused

History
- Original company: London and North Western Railway
- Pre-grouping: London and North Western Railway
- Post-grouping: London, Midland and Scottish Railway

Key dates
- 1 July 1862: Opened
- 1 April 1917: Closed
- 1 Feb 1919: Closed
- 2 June 1952: Closed
Location

Malins Lee railway station was a station in Malinslee, Shropshire, England. The station was opened in 1862 and closed in 1952. The station site marks the halfway point of the Silkin Way footpath which follows the railway alignment to the south as far as just short of the former Coalport East railway station.

Preceding station	Disused railways	Following station
Oakengates Market Street; Line and station closed	London, Midland and Scottish Railway; Coalport branch line	Dawley and Stirchley; Line and station closed
