= Castle Gate =

Castle Gate or Castlegate may refer to:

- The gate of a castle (such as a portcullis)

== Town or part of a town ==
- Castlegate, Aberdeen in Aberdeen, Scotland
- Castlegate Quarter in Sheffield, England
- Castle Gate, Utah, a ghost town in Utah, United States
- Castle Gate, Cornwall, a hamlet between St Ives and Penzance

== Shopping centre ==
- Castle Gate (Dudley shopping centre) in Dudley, England
- Castle Gate Shopping Centre (Shrewsbury) in Shrewsbury, England
- Castlegate shopping centre in Stockton-on-Tees

== Street ==
- Castle Gate, Nottingham, a street in Nottinghan, England
- Castlegate, Sheffield, a street in Sheffield, England
- Castlegate, York, a street in York, England
- Castlegate Drive, San Jose, a street in San Jose, United States

== Other ==
- Castlegate bunker in Germany
- Castle Gate Mine disaster in 1924

== See also ==
- St Mary's Church, Castlegate, York
