= 1872 in the United Kingdom =

Events from the year 1872 in the United Kingdom.

== Incumbents ==
- Monarch – Victoria
- Prime Minister – William Ewart Gladstone (Liberal)

== Events ==
- 1 January – C. P. Scott becomes editor of The Manchester Guardian, a position he will hold until 1929.
- January – opening of trial of Christiana Edmunds, the Brighton "Chocolate Cream Killer", for poisoning, at which she is found guilty.
- 2 February – British government buys a number of forts on the Gold Coast from the Netherlands.
- 5 March – Tichborne case decided against the impostor Arthur Orton.
- 11 March – work begins setting up Seven Sisters Colliery in South Wales, located on one of the richest coal sources in Britain.
- 16 March – in the first ever final of the FA Cup, the world's oldest football competition, Wanderers F.C. defeat Royal Engineers A.F.C. 1–0 at The Oval in Kennington, London.
- 1 April – at Lincoln Castle, uxoricide William Frederick Horry becomes the first person to be hanged by William Marwood and the first using Marwood's technique of the long drop.
- May – Rangers F.C. play their first ever game on the public pitches of Glasgow Green.
- June – American-born painter James McNeill Whistler exhibits Arrangement in Grey and Black: The Artist's Mother, painted the previous year in London, at the Royal Academy summer exhibition.
- 3 July – Queen Victoria opens the Albert Memorial in memory of her husband Prince Albert.
- 18 July
  - Ballot Act introduces secret ballots in United Kingdom elections, abolishing public hustings.
  - Philanthropist Angela Burdett-Coutts, 1st Baroness Burdett-Coutts, becomes the first woman to be made an Honorary Freeman of the City of London.
- 5 August – Hastings Pier opened. Designed by Eugenius Birch, it is the first in Britain with an entertainment pavilion incorporated from new.
- 10 August – Portland Breakwater completed.
- 15 August – 1872 Pontefract by-election, a ministerial by-election which is the first UK Parliamentary election held by secret ballot following the Ballot Act. The incumbent Hugh Childers retains his seat.
- 18 August – Licensing Act establishes licences for public houses and limits drinking hours.
- 1 September – a group of Icaiche Maya under Marcos Canul attack Orange Walk Town in British Honduras as part of the Caste War of Yucatán. British troops are sent against them.
- 7 October – an underground explosion at Morley Main Colliery, Morley, West Yorkshire, kills 34.
- 9 October – University College Wales opens at Aberystwyth.
- 16 November – London Metropolitan Police strike.
- 21 November – Wigan F.C. founded, the first Association football team in Wigan.
- 25 November – loss of the iron sailing ship Royal Adelaide on Chesil Beach: 60 saved, 7 drowned.
- 30 November – Scotland v England, the first FIFA-recognized international Association football match, takes place at Hamilton Crescent in Scotland. The result is a goalless draw.
- 6 December – Springwell Pit disaster at Dawley in Shropshire: eight coal miners fall to their death when a winding chain snaps.
- 12 December – a meteorite strikes Earth near Banbury.
- 21 December – the Challenger expedition sails from Portsmouth on the four year scientific expedition that will lay the foundation for the science of oceanography.

=== Undated ===
- Last recorded uses of the stocks for judicial punishment, at Newbury, Berkshire (11 June) and Adpar, Newcastle Emlyn, west Wales.
- Exceptionally consistent rain brings the wettest calendar year on record over England and Wales with 1,284.9 millimetres (50.6 in) beating previous record from 1768 by 37.6 millimetres (1.5 in). The nearest approach since has been 2012 with 1,244.3 millimetres (49.0 in) and 2000 with 1,232.5 millimetres (48.5 in).

== Publications ==
- First edition of Chambers's English Dictionary.
- Samuel Butler's anonymous satirical novel Erewhon.
- Charles Darwin's study The Expression of the Emotions in Man and Animals.
- George Eliot's novel Middlemarch (serialisation completed).
- Thomas Hardy's anonymous romantic novel Under the Greenwood Tree.
- Samuel Plimsoll's campaigning work Our Seamen.

== Births ==
- 16 January – Edward Gordon Craig, theatrical designer (died 1966)
- 11 February – Hannah Mitchell, socialist, suffragette (died 1956)
- 12 February – Alexander Gibb, Scottish-born civil engineer (died 1958)
- 11 March – K. C. Groom, fiction writer (died 1954)
- 25 April – C. B. Fry, cricketer (died 1956)
- 5 May – Norman Smith, Scottish philosopher (died 1958)
- 12 May – Eleanor Rathbone, social campaigner and politician (died 1946)
- 18 May – Bertrand Russell, philosopher and mathematician, recipient of the Nobel Prize in Literature (died 1970)
- 31 May – Heath Robinson, cartoonist and illustrator (died 1944)
- 13 June – Chrystal Macmillan, Scottish mathematician, suffragist, politician, barrister and pacifist (died 1937)
- 2 July – Horace Short, aircraft designer (died 1917)
- 4 July – Harry Tate, born Ronald Macdonald Hutchison, music hall comedian (died 1940)
- 23 July – Edward Wilson, explorer, physician, naturalist and ornithologist (died 1912 in Antarctica)
- 25 July – Herbert Stanley, Governor of Northern Rhodesia, Ceylon and Southern Rhodesia (died 1955)
- 21 August – Aubrey Beardsley, artist (died 1898)
- 4 October – Roger Keyes, admiral (died 1945)
- 8 October – John Cowper Powys, writer and philosopher (died 1963)
- 12 October – Ralph Vaughan Williams, composer (died 1958)
- 30 October – Louisa Martindale, physician, writer, magistrate and prison commissioner (died 1966)
- 20 November – Alfred Mylne, yacht designer (died 1951)
- 11 December – René Bull, illustrator, photographer (died 1942)
- 26 December – Norman Angell, politician, recipient of the Nobel Peace Prize (died 1967)
- Edith Garrud, née Williams, pioneer martial artist and suffragist (died 1971)

== Deaths ==
- 14 January – Greyfriars Bobby, faithful Scottish terrier (born 1855)
- 6 February – Sir Thomas Phillipps, book collector (born 1792)
- 16 February – Henry Chorley, critic (born 1808)
- 27 February – John McLeod Campbell, Scottish theologian (born 1800)
- 8 March – Priscilla Susan Bury, botanist (born 1799)
- 11 March – Emily Taylor, writer for children (born 1795)
- 1 April – Frederick Denison Maurice, theologian (born 1805)
- 23 May – Henry Bulwer, 1st Baron Dalling and Bulwer, politician, diplomat and writer (born 1801)
- 20 August – William Miller, Scottish children's poet (born 1810)
- 18 September – Herbert Haines, clergyman, archaeologist and schoolteacher (born 1826)
- 23 November – Sir John Bowring, colonial administrator, 4th Governor of Hong Kong (born 1792)
- 28 November – Mary Somerville, mathematician (born 1780)
- 10 December – Edwin Norris, philologist, linguist and orientalist (born 1795)
- 15 December – Mary Anne Disraeli, wife of Benjamin Disraeli (born 1792)
- 24 December – Macquorn Rankine, Scottish pioneer of thermodynamics (born 1820)
