= Hadley railway station =

Disused railway station in Shropshire, England

Hadley
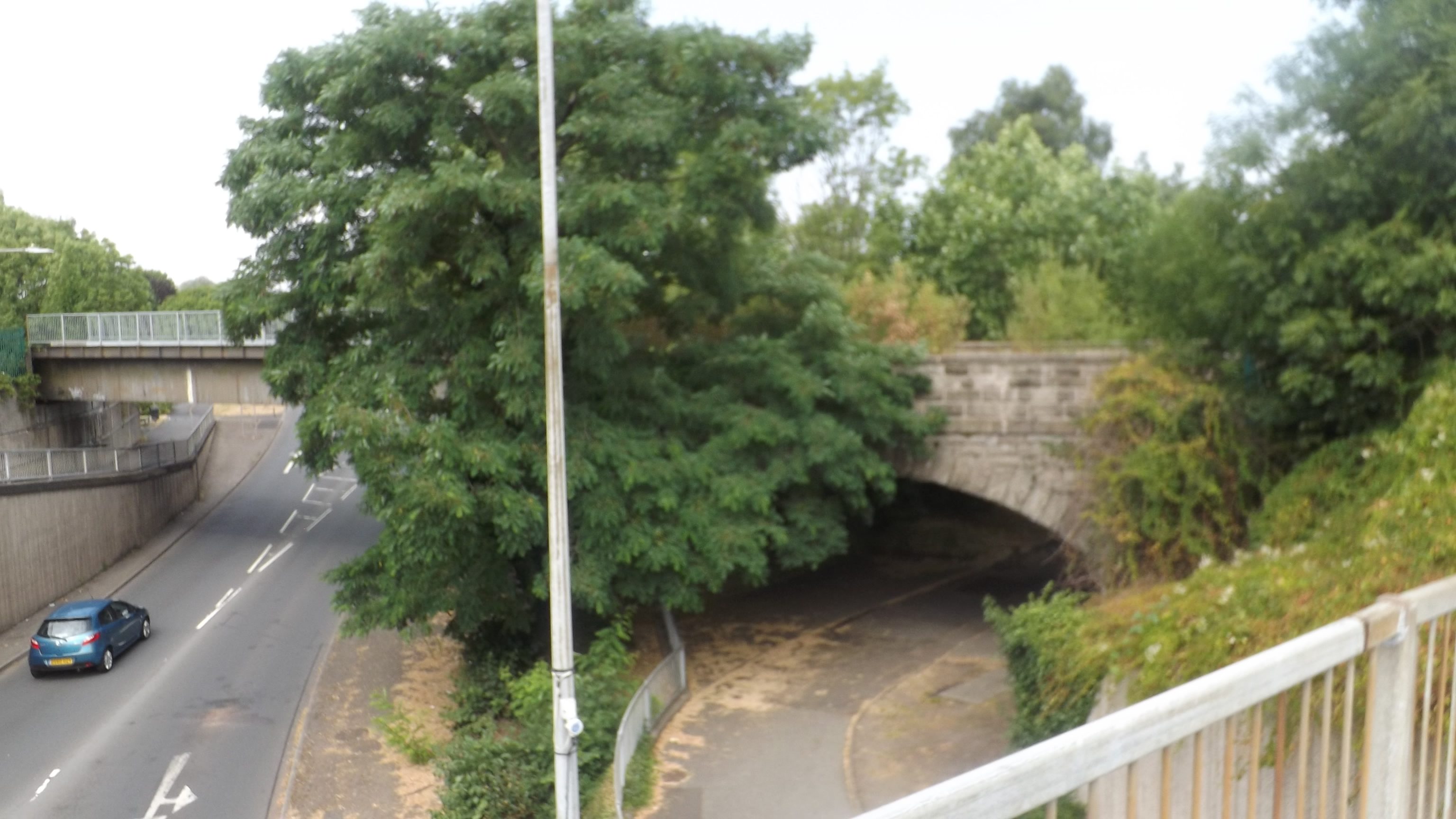
- Hadley railway station site

General information
- Location: Hadley, Shropshire; England
- Coordinates: 52.7056°N 2.4878°W
- Grid reference: SJ672122
- Platforms: 2

Other information
- Status: Disused

History
- Original company: Shropshire Union Railways and Canal Company
- Pre-grouping: London and North Western Railway
- Post-grouping: London, Midland and Scottish Railway

Key dates
- 1 June 1849: Opened
- 7 September 1964: Closed
Location

Hadley railway station was a railway station serving the village of Hadley in Shropshire, England. The station served both the former Stafford to Shrewsbury Line and was the start of the branch to Coalport. The station was opened in 1849 and closed in 1964.

The line through Hadley was closed from 1964, with the last remaining stretches of track being taken up in 1991. In the late 2000s a stretch of track was relaid to the Telford International Railfreight Park for freight purposes only.

The current closest station is Wellington, or a little further afield are both Oakengates or Telford.

Preceding station	Disused railways	Following station
Wellington; Line and station open	London and North Western Railway; Stafford to Shrewsbury Line	Trench Crossing; Line open, station closed
Terminus	London and North Western Railway; Coalport Branch Line	Oakengates Market Street; Line and station closed
