= Madeley Market railway station =

Disused railway station in Shropshire, England

Madeley Market
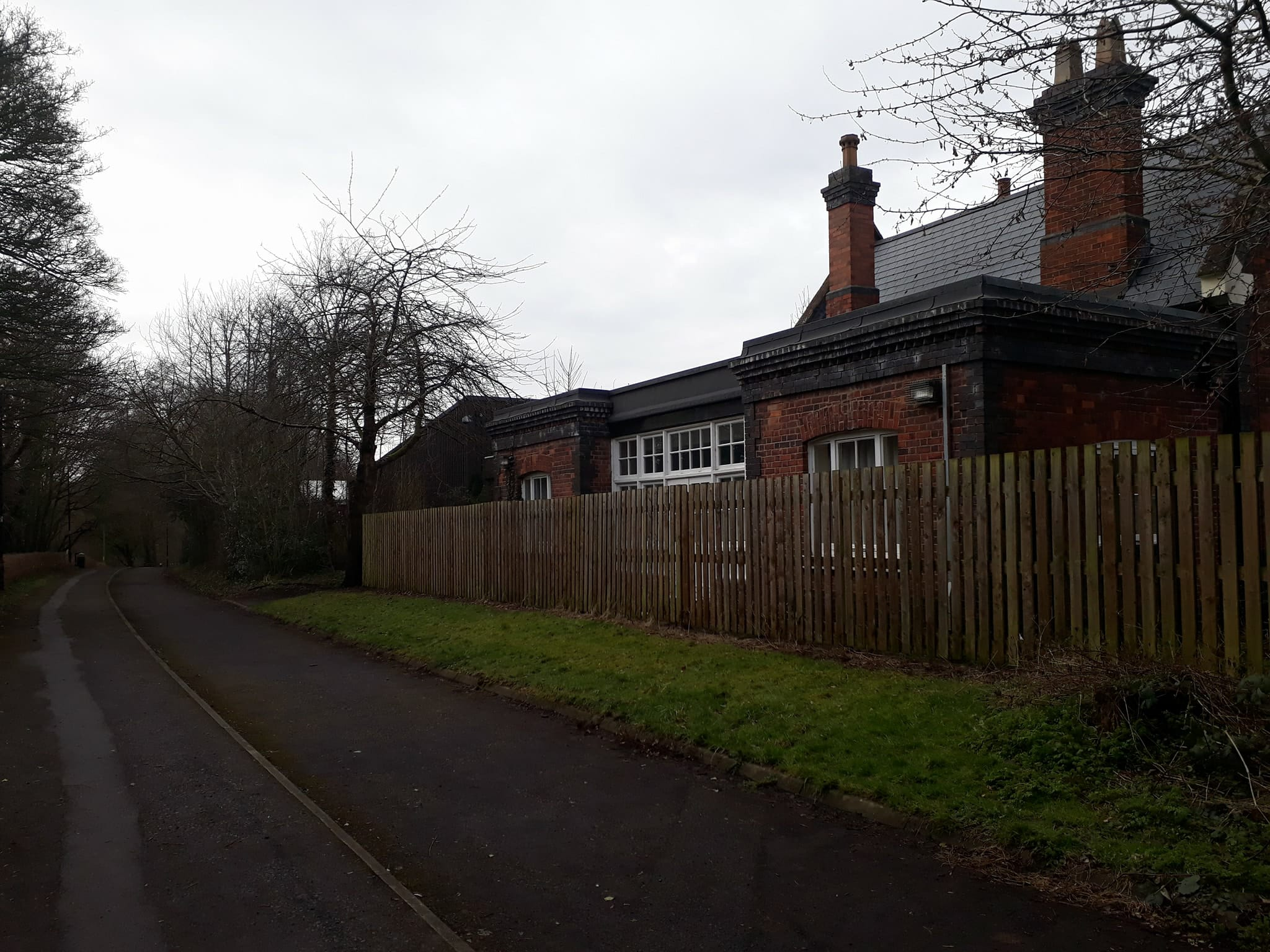
- Madeley Market station building in 2018

General information
- Location: Telford, Shropshire; England
- Coordinates: 52.6357°N 2.4447°W
- Grid reference: SJ699043
- Platforms: 1

Other information
- Status: Disused

History
- Pre-grouping: London and North Western Railway
- Post-grouping: London, Midland and Scottish Railway

Key dates
- 10 June 1861: Opened
- 2 June 1952: Closed for passengers
- 5 December 1960: closed for freight
Location

Madeley Market railway station is a disused railway station in Shropshire, England.

The station was opened by the London and North Western Railway in 1861 on the company's Coalport Branch Line to serve the town of Madeley, Shropshire. It closed to passengers in 1952, and to freight on 5 December 1960.

| Preceding station | Disused railways | Following station |
|---|---|---|
| Dawley and Stirchley; Line closed, station closed | London and North Western Railway; Coalport Branch Line | Coalport East; Line closed, station closed |
