= Oakengates Market Street railway station =

Disused railway station in Shropshire, England

Oakengates Market Street

General information
- Location: Oakengates, Shropshire; England
- Coordinates: 52.6953°N 2.4479°W
- Grid reference: SJ698109
- Platforms: 2

Other information
- Status: Disused

History
- Opened: 1860
- Closed: 1952
- Original company: London and North Western Railway
- Pre-grouping: London and North Western Railway
- Post-grouping: London, Midland and Scottish Railway
Location

Oakengates Market Street railway station was a station in Oakengates, Shropshire, England. The station was opened in 1860 and closed in 1952. The station was demolished after closure and the site is now occupied by the A442.

Preceding station	Disused railways	Following station
Hadley; Line and station closed	London, Midland and Scottish Railway; Coalport branch line	Malins Lee; Line and station closed
