= Eddie Garbett =

English footballer

Personal information
- Full name: William Edward Garbett
- Date of birth: 14 September 1949 (age 77)
- Place of birth: Dawley, England
- Position: Right winger

Youth career
- Shrewsbury Town

Senior career*
Years	Team	Apps	(Gls)
1967–1969	Shrewsbury Town	11	(2)
1969–1972	Barrow	119	(27)
1972–1974	Stockport County	70	(11)
1974–19??	Telford United		
- * Club domestic league appearances and goals

William Edward Garbett (born 14 September 1949) is an English former professional footballer who scored 40 goals from 200 appearances in the Football League playing on the right wing for Shrewsbury Town, Barrow and Stockport County. He also played non-league football for Telford United.

== Personal life ==
After his playing career, Garbett was employed at GKN Sankey in Telford, Shropshire before becoming director of a milk delivery company. He was living at Ketley, Telford, in 2008.
