= The Telford Langley School =

Location
- Duce Drive; Dawley, Telford, Shropshire, TF4 3JS; England; 52.66281°N 2.46449°W

Information
- Type: Academy
- Motto: Ensuring Excellence
- Religious affiliation: Not applicable
- Established: 1956 (as Dawley Modern School); 1965 (renamed Phoenix ComprehensiveSchool); 2013 (converted to academy status and renamed Phoenix Academy); 2015 (renamed The Telford Langley School)
- Founder: George Chetwood
- Department for Education URN: 139766 Tables
- Ofsted: Reports
- Headteacher: Emma Blount
- Gender: Coeducational
- Age: 11 to 16
- Enrolment: 1000
- Houses: Chetwood, Ellis, Springwell, Webb
- Website: www.telfordlangleyschool.co.uk

The Telford Langley School is a coeducational secondary school with academy status, located in the Dawley area of Telford in Shropshire, England.

Its predecessor, Dawley Modern School, was opened at Pool Hill on 17 September 1956 by Mr George Chetwood, to take children over 11 from four contributory primary schools; there were c. 500 pupils on the roll. By 1965 when comprehensive secondary education was introduced the school was renamed the Phoenix Comprehensive School (its name coming from idea that it 'rose from the ashes' of its predecessor). The number of pupils had risen to 1,159 by 1980. The main hall, canteen, and gymnasium, were destroyed in an arson attack on 29 December 1995.

The school was at one point in special measures, but standards have improved to the point where in 2007 the school gained a 'good' Ofsted report. The report noted that GCSE A*-C rates were below the national average but the school was commended for the high amount of progress pupils made between Year 7 and 11.

The school converted to academy status on 1 June 2013, and was renamed Phoenix Academy. The school became part of the Telford Co-operative Multi-Academy Trust. The school was moved from Manor Road to Duce Drive at the site of Paddock Mount in September 2013 though the redevelopment of the mount was controversial. In June 2010 a Hollywood-style sign for Dawley was erected on a prominent slope of the mount in protest.

The school was placed in special measures again in April 2015, and changed to a new academy sponsor in September 2015, the Community Academies Trust. As a result of the measures, the school was subject to a re-branding which included changes in staff, uniform, and name. In September 2015, the Phoenix Academy was changed to The Telford Langley School. However, the school was removed from special measures in March 2019.

In September 2021, additions to the existing school building and the construction of a new building finished. This was done as a part of Telford and Wrekin Council's 'Building Schools for the Future' program which put £200 million into upgrading and expanding existing Secondary Schools in the borough, £31 million of which were put into the school.

In July 2022, then-Headteacher Mr Steve Carter retired and Mrs Emma Blount (then-Deputy Headteacher) was appointed as the new Headteacher starting from September of that year.
