= New Riverside, Shrewsbury =

Coordinates: 52°42′33″N 2°45′14″W

New Riverside is a proposed £150m shopping centre redevelopment project in Shrewsbury, Shropshire, England, which is planned to link the town's Darwin and former Pride Hill centres and comprehensively redevelop the Riverside centre site.

The redevelopment will comprise approximately 50 new shops and 15 new restaurant and cafe units, totalling around 225,000 sq ft and create one, linked and extended centre of 680,000 sq ft.

Preliminary plans were put to public consultation in July 2011 and the scheme was granted planning permission in April 2012. Work was due to start summer 2013 with completion due late 2015, however a delay to the project was announced in May 2013.

The demolition of the Riverside Shopping Centre commenced in August 2024.

== Scheme features ==
The developers maintain New Riverside will be built with high quality materials and improve connectivity in the town.

The reconfigured shopping centres will link with the town centre from the main shopping thoroughfare of Pride Hill through to Raven Meadows multi-storey car park, the riverside and Frankwell, Roushill Bank with access to Mardol and to the bus station. New 'multi level streets' covered by a petal roof of the design seen at Bristol's Cabot Circus and Trinity Leeds will meet at a central public space and terrace down to the river at Smithfield Road.

The predominantly 5-storey development has been designed by architects Chapman Taylor as three distinct 'blocks':-

- Block One has a strong, vertical frame and largely houses the department store and restaurant terrace at roof level;
- Block Two is separated into a brick landmark building with restaurant occupancy stepping back towards Smithfield Road, an active office frontage facing Roushill and a rounded, semi-active neo-classical retail frontage facing Roushill Bank;
- Block Three fronts the rear of the Darwin centre, covering over a section of the service and car park access road of Raven Meadows.

Approximate proposed changes in gross floorspace for A1, A2 and A3 unit classes in each of the three existing shopping centres:

	Existing floorspace	After works	Difference
Pride Hill	105,320 sq ft	100,960 sq ft	-4,360 sq ft
Darwin	249,630 sq ft	243,860 sq ft	-5,770 sq ft
Riverside	89,930 sq ft	371,355 sq ft	+281,425 sq ft
Department store	-	99,565 sq ft	-
Retail units	-	271,790 sq ft	-
Total gross floorspace	444,880 sq ft	716,175 sq ft	+271,295 sq ft

== History ==
The malls have shared a turbulent recent history, coming under common ownership in 2003 under Dunedin Property. Protego's UK Actively Managed Shopping Centre Fund acquired the centres in 2006, serviced by a loan provided by Lehman Brothers. Defaulting on £82m of that loan, the centres entered receivership with the collapse of Lehman.

UK Commercial Property Trust took control of the three centres in March 2010 and is under management by Ignis Asset Management, advised by Shearer Property Group. In October 2010, Chapman Taylor Architects were hired by Shearer Property to devise plans for refurbishment as part of a wider renewal and redevelopment of the estate.

There has long been an ambition to physically link the Darwin and Pride Hill shopping centres. The most pursued opportunity has been through the development of vacant land between the sites to precede a larger-scale regeneration of the Riverside site. The 'Gap site' was a retail and leisure link development proposed by Morris Property, owners of the land, and was granted full planning permission in 2006 prior to the centres being sold to new owners. The onset of economic crisis ensured the scheme was put on hold. Dunedin, promoters of the scheme in 2005, put four branding proposals to the public vote in a high-profile marketing push for the renaming of the present centres following the new development's completion. The reconfigured centre would have been branded 'Castle Gate'.

== Previous proposals ==
The Castle Gate Shopping Centre was a proposal to link and rename two shopping malls in Shrewsbury in central England. Dunedin Property received permission for a £30m "Darwin Link" between their Pride Hill and Darwin centres in February 2005. Named Castle Gate that summer following a high-profile public vote on the name, the new complex was a victim of Dunedin's strategic decision to get out of retail property in 2006. A smaller proposal to link the two centres was considered by Morris Property, however was not taken forward.

=== Background ===
The Dunedin Property Retail Fund bought the 250,000 sq ft (23,000 m^{2}) Darwin Shopping Centre from Delancey as part of a £120m portfolio of properties in February 2001. In 2003 they bought the 110,000 sq ft (10,000 m^{2}) Pride Hill Shopping Centre, an adjoining unit and the Riverside Mall from Royal SunAlliance's ISIS Property in a £25m deal. In 2005 Dunedin received outline planning permission for a 100,000 sq ft (9,000 m^{2}) six-storey mall linking the two, and were in negotiations with Morris Property, the owner of the Raven Meadows car park between the two shopping centres.

=== Vote on name ===
The logo for the proposal

The £30m scheme had the working title of "Darwin Link", but Dunedin canvassed locals for a new name for the combined malls. Over 100 names were suggested, but market research agency The Big Picture whittled this down to a shortlist of four.

Voting began on 25 July 2005 in voting booths at the centres and online voting commenced shortly afterwards. Over 11,000 votes were cast, with a final push at the town's annual Flower Show. It was announced on 13 August 2005, that 'Castle Gate' had won with 33% of the vote. 'Tudor Place' came second with 31%, followed by 'River Hill' (21%) and 'Quayside' (15%). The name could be confused with the existing street in the town called Castle Gates.

=== After Dunedin ===
Work was due to start in February 2006, but as part of a change in strategic direction, in March 2006 Dunedin sold the two centres for £115m to Protego Real Estate Investors and Boultbee Land. The deal was completed just before the abolition that month of Stamp Duty exemption for Jersey property unit trusts (JPUTs). Dunedin called in the receivers in September 2008. These formed the core of Protego's £350m UK Actively Managed Shopping Centre Fund, a JPUT launched in September 2006 managed by Boultbee's subsidiary EFM Asset Management. In November 2006 Morris received full planning permission for a smaller link development on the Raven Meadows site. The £10m scheme is scheduled to open in 2010.

Protego bought the centres by borrowing money from Lehman Brothers and in September 2009 it was announced that the Lehman administrators PWC would be offering the properties for sale for between £40m and £50m. The special servicer of the debt, Hatfield Philips, appointed Savills to market the centres.

== See also ==
- Darwin Shopping Centre
- Telford Shopping Centre - shopping centre in nearby Telford
