= Silkin Way =

Foot and cycle path in Telford, England

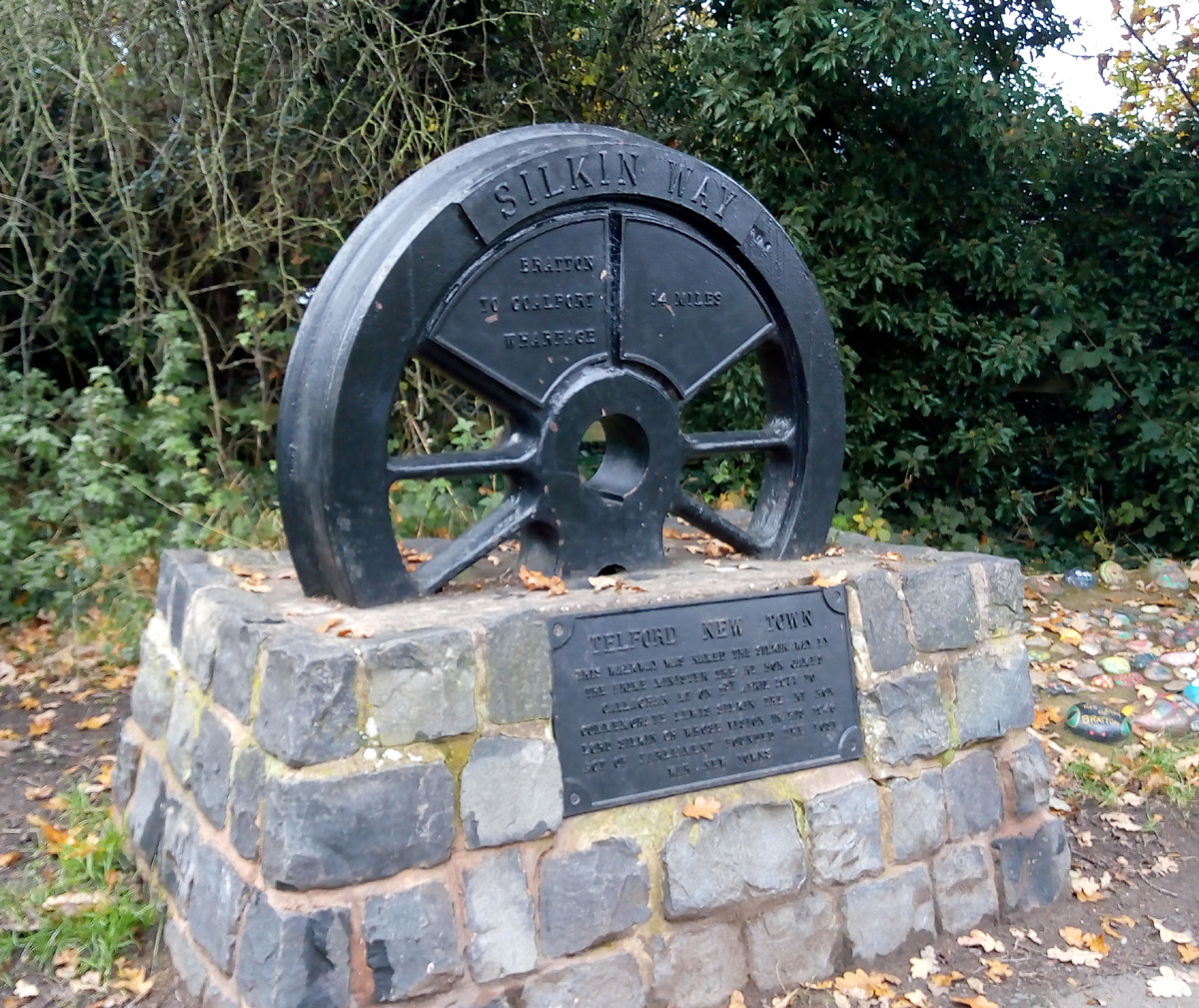
- The black iron wheel close to the starting point in Bratton
- Length: 23 km (14 mi)
- Location: Telford, United Kingdom
- Established: 1977
- Designation: Medium distance footpath
- Trailheads: Bratton, Apley Castle Park, Trench Pool, Telford Central Station, Telford Town Park, Blists Hill Victorian Town, Coalport Bridge
- Use: Walking & Cycling
- Highest point: 169 m (554 ft), Snedshill
- Lowest point: 47 m (154 ft), Coalport
- Difficulty: Easy
- Season: All year
- Waymark: Black iron 'Silkin Way' wheels mark important junctions
- Sights: Apley Castle; Telford Town Park; Blists Hill Victorian Town; Coalport China Museum
- Surface: Mainly smooth and flat paths
- Maintainer: Telford & Wrekin Council

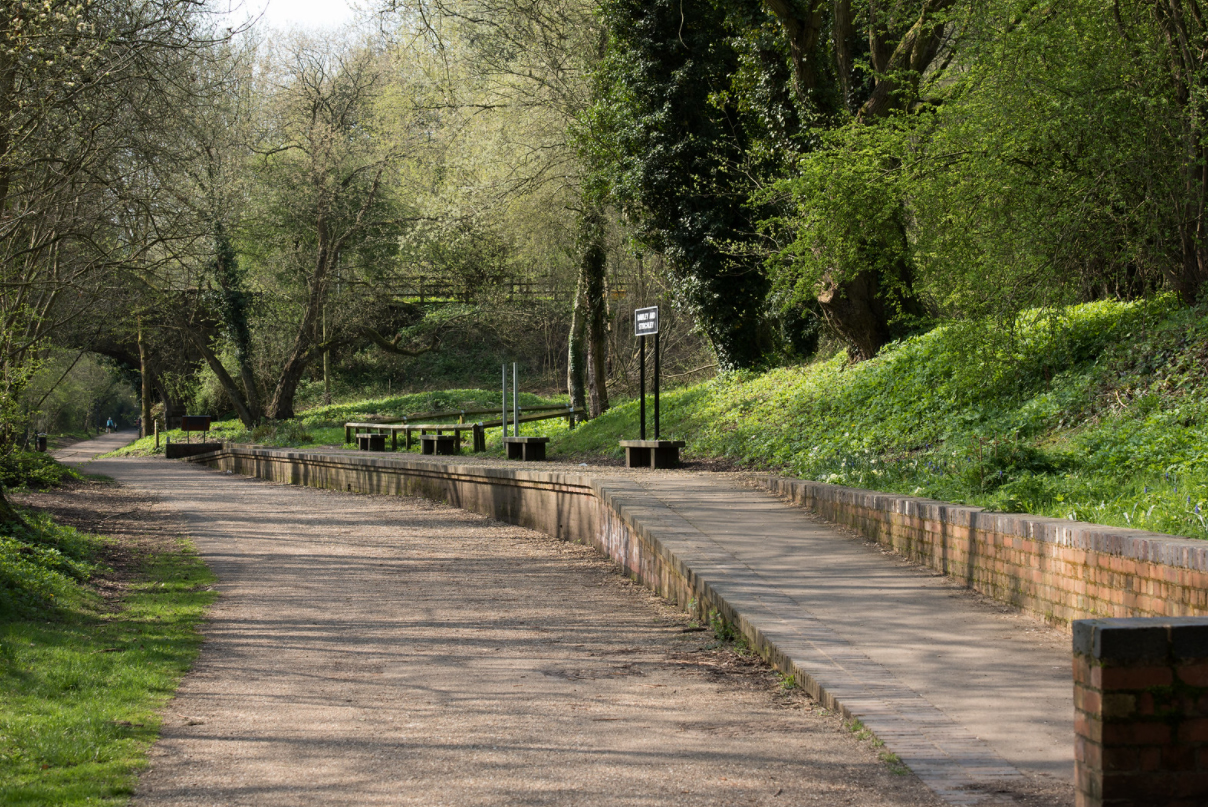
Dawley & Stirchley Railway Station

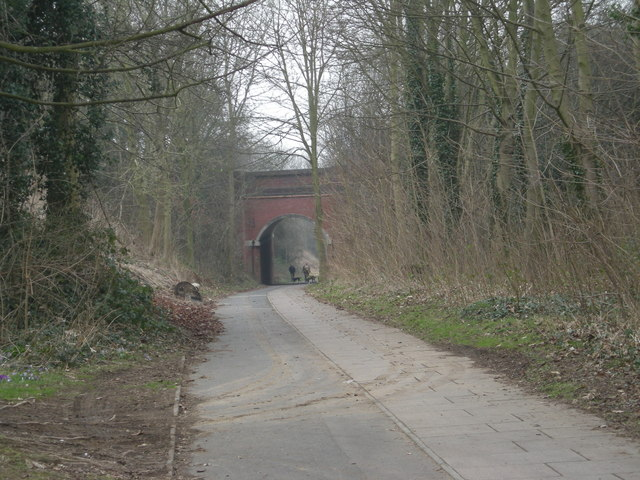
The Silkin Way south of the Southall Road overbridge

The Silkin Way is a 14 mile (23 km) walking and cycling route through Telford starting in Bratton and finishing in Coalport. In places the path follows the former Great Western Railway and the dry canal beds of the old Shropshire Canal and goes via Telford Town Centre and the Ironbridge Gorge World Heritage Site. Along the route the Silkin Way runs close to the many natural and historical features within Telford and shows great contrasts between futuristic architecture, woodlands, and mature parkland.

== History ==
The path is named after Lewis Silkin, the Minister responsible for the post-war Labour Government's New Towns Act 1946 and Access to the Countryside Act 1949. The Town Park to Coalport section of the route was opened in 1977 by the Prime Minister James Callaghan and the Bratton to Town Park northern section was added later. The path is marked with distinctive black iron wheels at important junctions.

== Path description ==
Silkin Way is a designated cycle route and for most of the way uses old railway paths and canal beds and is mainly on flat and fairly smooth surfaces. There are a few steps but most are wide and easy to push bikes up and down. Cyclists are asked to use the alternative cycle route around the Telford Shopping Centre section. The highest part is on the approach to Holyhead Road just before Telford Central railway station providing an opportunity for walkers to divide the Silkin Way into two parts. With many places to stop and see on the path, Telford & Wrekin Council describe it is like a book - "you can read it all at once or just dip into it from time to time, digesting at your leisure".

== Places of interest ==
The Silkin Way passes through many areas showing the history of Telford and those of particular interest include:

- Apley Castle Park
- Hadley Park Mill
- Telford Town Park
- Stirchley Chimney and Furnace
- Dawley and Stirchley railway station
- Madeley Windmill
- Madeley Market Station
- Blists Hill Victorian Town
- Lee Dingle Bridge
- Coalport China Museum
- Coalport Bridge

== See also ==
- Coalport Branch Line
- Ironbridge Gorge Museum Trust
- Long Distance Footpaths in the UK
