= Bremen Town House =

- Bremen Town Hall, Former
- U.S. National Register of Historic Places
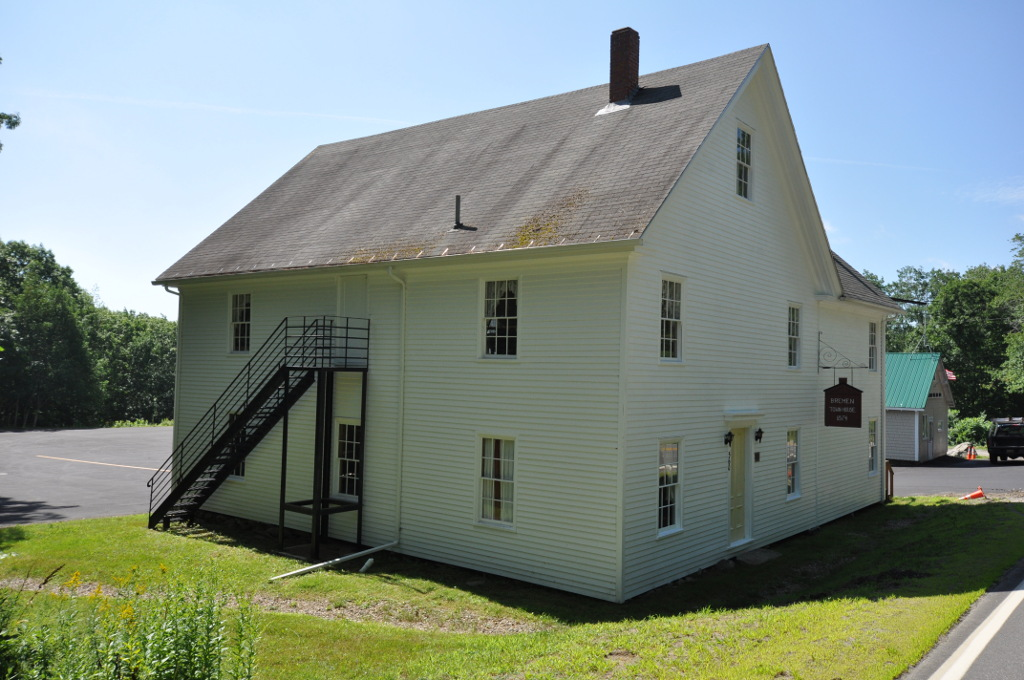

- Location within Maine Location within the United States
- Location: Rte 32, 0.2 mi. N of Medomak Rd., Medomak (Bremen), Maine
- Coordinates: 44°0′47″N 69°25′18″W
- Area: less than one acre
- Built: 1874
- Architectural style: Late Victorian
- NRHP reference No.: 00000372
- Added to NRHP: April 14, 2000

The Bremen Town House, formerly Bremen Town Hall is a historic municipal building on Maine State Route 32 in Bremen, Maine. Built in 1874 and sympathetically enlarged in 1938, it served for many years as the community's town hall, and continues to serve the community as one of its major social gathering points. The building was listed on the National Register of Historic Places in 2000.

== Description and history ==
The Bremen Town House is located near the geographic center of Bremen, on the east side of Waldoboro Road (SR 32), the major north-south route through the community. The building is a two-story wood frame structure, with an L-shaped plan and gabled roof. Its exterior is clad in clapboards, and the building rests on a stone foundation. The original main block is oriented with its gable end to the street, the original main entrance framed by simple molding and topped by a cornice. Bays to either side house sash windows on both the first and second floors, and there is a fifth window in the gable. A lower two-story cross-gabled addition extends to its right, its side flush to the front of the main block. Its street-facing facade has single windows on both levels, set near the far right corner. There is a second entrance in the addition's south side, trimmed in a manner similar to the original front door.

The building was erected in 1874 by a local chapter of the Good Templars, a temperance organization. In 1877 the town began to use it for town meetings, and purchased the building outright in 1884. It was used as a government and social meeting venue until 1959, when the town moved its functions into new facilities. It continues to be owned by the town, and continues to function as a community meeting place. The building was enlarged in 1938, the ell adding a kitchen and space for the town selectmen. The town continues to own the building, which is managed under lease by a local nonprofit.

== See also ==
- Good Templars Hall
- Dawley Town Hall
- National Register of Historic Places listings in Lincoln County, Maine
