= Dawley Town Hall =

Events venue in Dawley, Shropshire, England

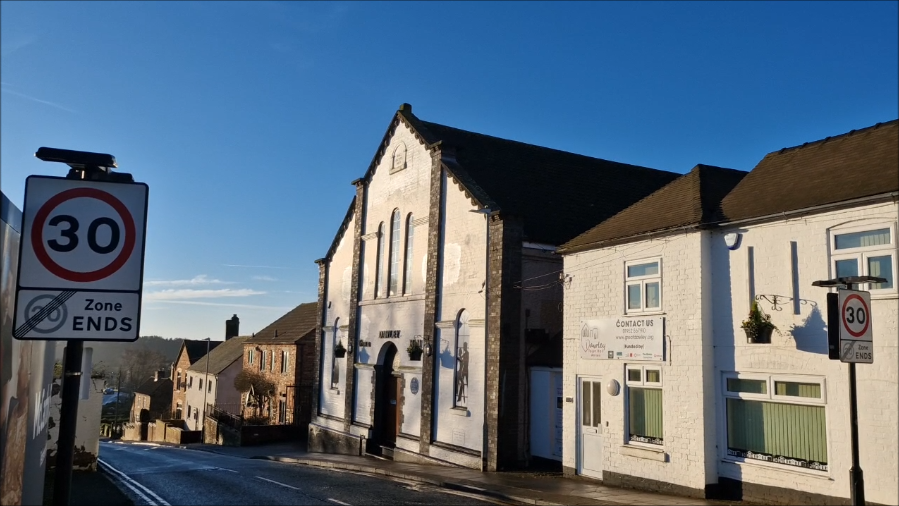
- The building in 2025

- Shown in Shropshire
- 52.6629°N 2.4665°W
- Location: New Street, Dawley

History
- Built: 1873

Site notes
- Architect: Mr Patterson
- Architectural style: Gothic Revival style
- Website: Official website

Dawley Town Hall is an events venue in New Street in Dawley, Shropshire, England.

== History ==
The venue was commissioned as a temperance hall for the International Organisation of Good Templars. Their aim was to encourage abstinence from alcohol within the local mining community, and they formed a company to finance and commission the building. The site they selected was an elevated point in Dawley known as Dun Cow Bank.

The foundation stone for the new building was laid by the Rector of Church Tilton in Cheshire, the Reverend William Bishton Garnett-Botfield of Decker Hill, on 13 October 1873. It was designed by a Mr Patterson of Wellington in the Gothic Revival style, built by Rowland Smitheman of Broseley in brick with a stucco finish at a cost of £900, and was probably completed sometime in 1874. The design involved a symmetrical main frontage of three bays facing onto New Street. The central bay featured a round headed doorway with grey brick quoins on the ground floor, and three tall round headed windows on the first floor. The outer bays were also fenestrated by tall round headed windows. There was a gable above which was modillioned and contained a date stone above the central bay. Internally, the principal room was the main hall which was 60 feet (18 m) long and 40 feet (12 m) wide. There was a gallery at the east end and a stage, suitable for an orchestra, at the west end.

The building hosted a variety of events, and in 1900 showed its first film. In 1913, it became the Royal Windsor Variety and Picture Palace, but this closed before the end of the First World War. The venue then became a theatre, before it was acquired by Dawley Urban District Council, which let it out for a wide variety of events. After the Second World War, these included both Catholic and non-conformist church services. In November 1962, it hosted the public enquiry into plans for Dawley New Town, which were later realised as Telford.

In 2002, the hall became the home of an amateur dramatics group, the Telford Stage School. The school moved out in 2010, following which, the building was refurbished at a cost of £150,000. Following completion of the works, the building reopened and was made available for local groups so that they could host events. In August 2015, an event was held at the town hall to celebrate the life of the local swimmer, Matthew Webb, who was the first recorded person to swim the English Channel for sport without the use of artificial aids.

The town hall annex, immediately to the north of the main building was reopened as a community meeting room, known as Randle House in memory of a former mayor, Malcolm Randle, in February 2022. In November 2023, Prince Edward, Duke of Edinburgh, visited the town hall and met with civic leaders and members of the local branch of the Royal British Legion and unveiled a plaque commemorating the 150th anniversary of the building.

== See also ==
- Bremen Town House
