= Dawley and Stirchley railway station =

Disused railway station in Shropshire, England

Dawley and Stirchley
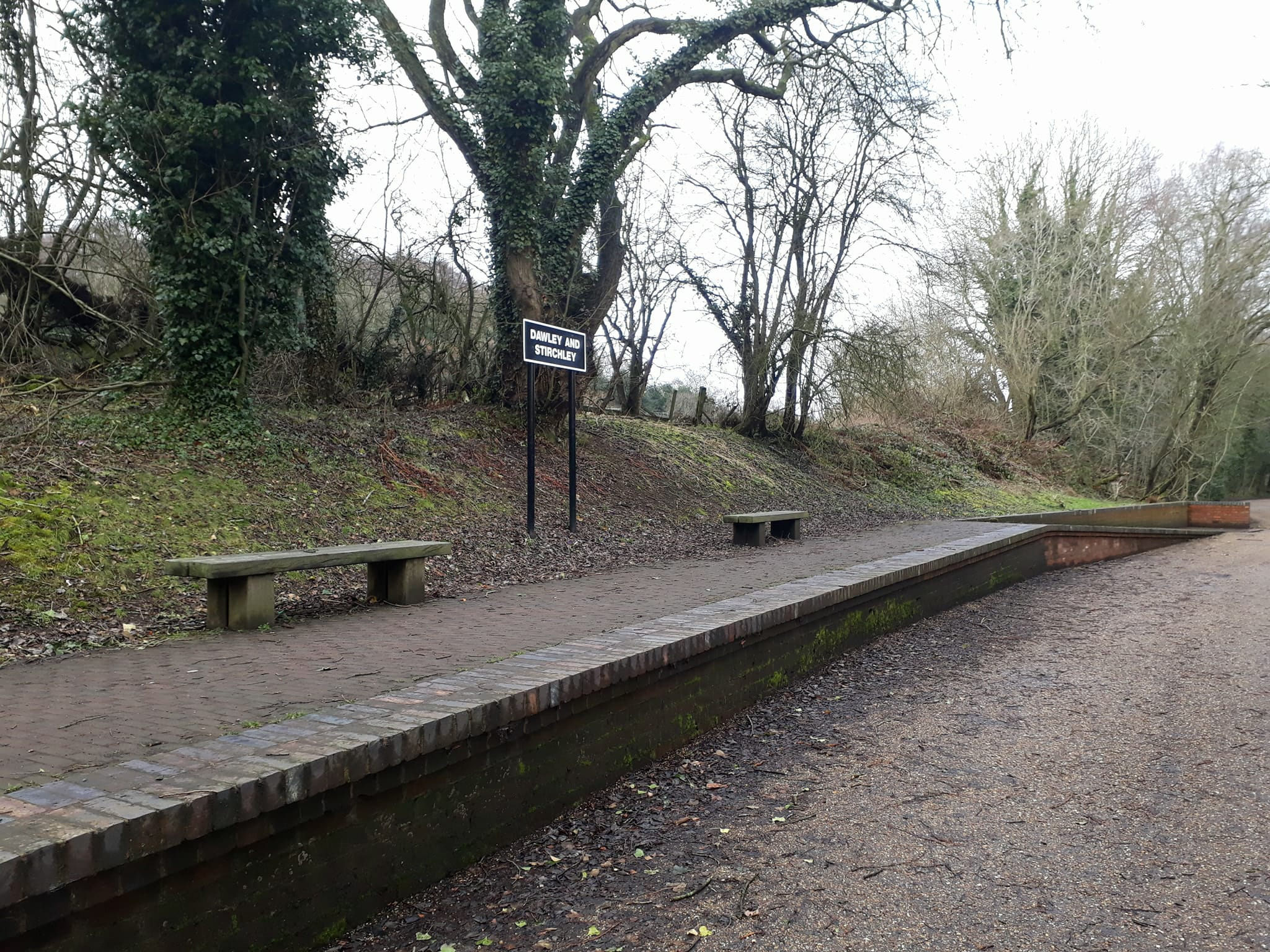
- Dawley and Stirchley platform in 2018, now part of the Silkin Way

General information
- Location: Dawley, Shropshire; England
- Coordinates: 52.6573°N 2.4517°W
- Grid reference: SJ695067

Other information
- Status: Disused

History
- Original company: London and North Western Railway
- Pre-grouping: London and North Western Railway
- Post-grouping: London, Midland and Scottish Railway

Key dates
- 10 June 1861: Opened
- 2 June 1952: Closed
Location

Dawley and Stirchley railway station was a station in Dawley, Shropshire, England. The station was opened in 1861 and closed in 1952.

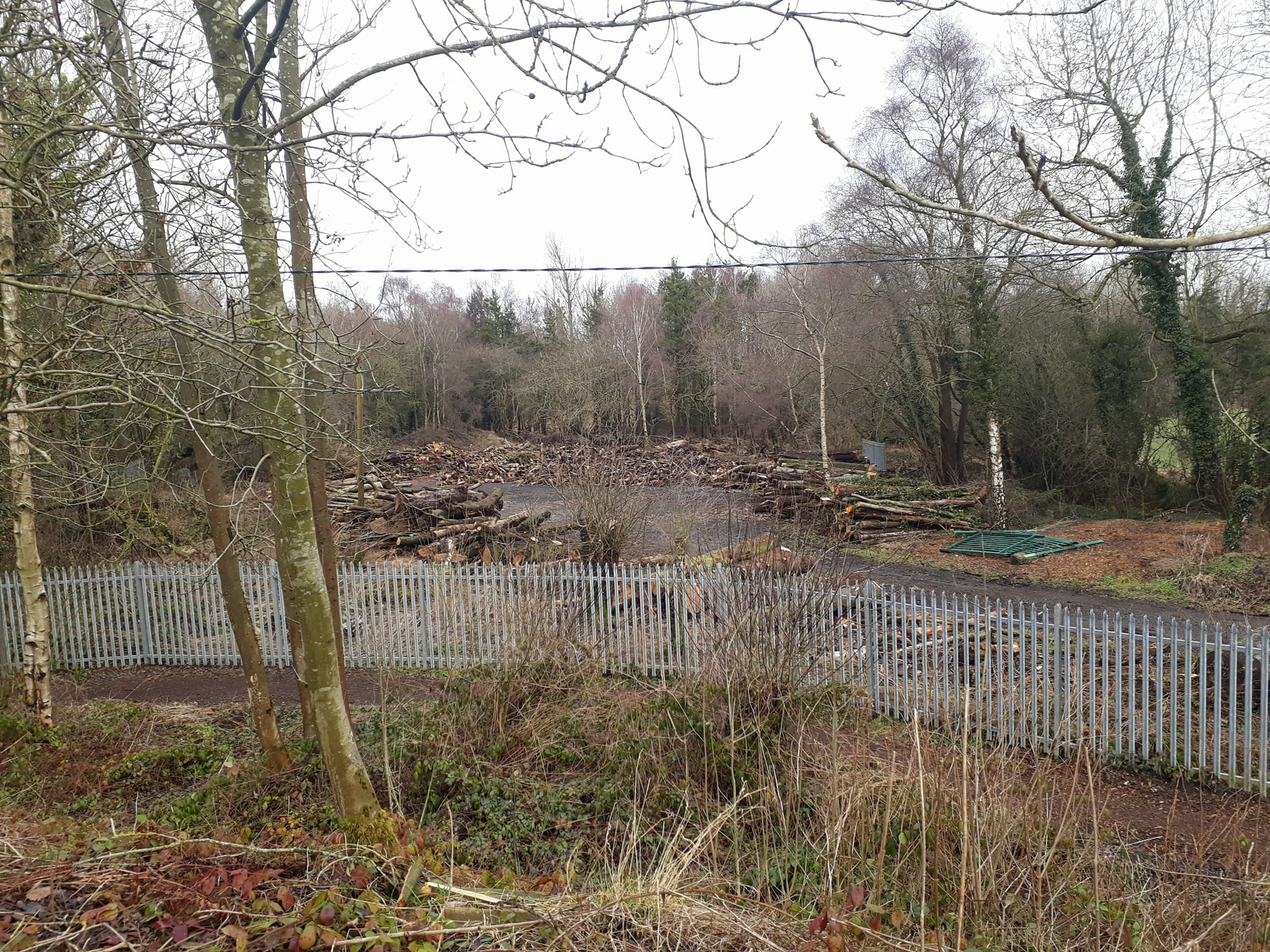
Dawley and Stirchley station goods yard in 2018

Preceding station	Disused railways	Following station
Malins Lee; Line and station closed	London, Midland and Scottish Railway; Coalport branch line	Madeley Market; Line and station closed
