= Darwin Shopping Centre =

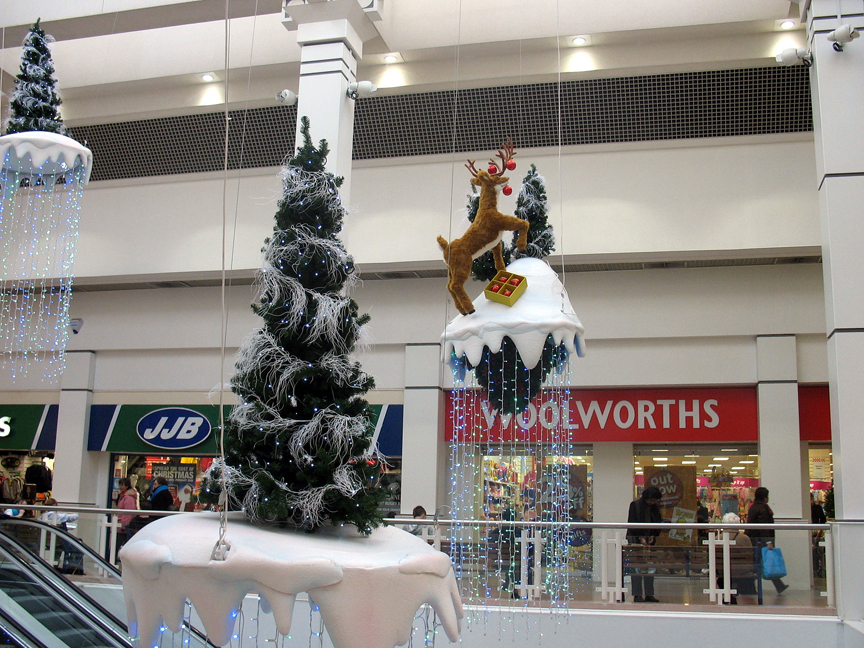
- Top floor in 2007
- Location: Shrewsbury, England
- Coordinates: 52.7102°N 2.7523°W
- Owner: UK Commercial Property Trust (managed by Ignis Asset Management) & Shearer Property Group
- Num. of stores: 53 (2010)
- Num. of anchor tenants: 2 (Marks & Spencer and Primark)
- Floor area: 189,316 sq ft (17,588.0 m^{2})
- Floors: 4
- Parking: 920 spaces
- Website: shrewsbury-shopping.co.uk

The Darwin Shopping Centre (currently promoted as The Darwin) is the main shopping centre in Shrewsbury, Shropshire, England, comprising approximately 17 per cent of the town centre's retail offer by leasable area.

It was built by John Laing Developments in 1989 and refurbished in 2002. It was in 2010 due to undergo further refurbishment in a plan being devised by Chapman Taylor Architects as part of the New Riverside redevelopment.

== Ownership ==
The mall has shared a turbulent recent history with the former Pride Hill and Riverside centres which came under common ownership in 2003 under Dunedin Property. Protego's UK Actively Managed Shopping Centre Fund acquired the centres in 2006, serviced by a loan provided by Lehman Brothers. Defaulting on £82m of that loan, the centres entered receivership with the collapse of Lehman.

UK Commercial Property Trust (managed by Ignis Asset Management and abbreviated UKCPT) took control of the three centres in March 2010 and was under management by Ignis and Shearer Property Group. The Darwin centre was attributed a nominal value of £38.6m as part of the £63.6m purchase.

UKCPT, following failure of their proposed development to link the Darwin and Pride Hill shopping centres with Riverside, sold the three centres to Shropshire Council who agreed to purchase them for £51M in 2018.

== Retailers ==
Marks & Spencer anchors the centre and is the largest unit by some way, featuring two retail floors and a mezzanine level. The former Woolworths was reconfigured into H&M and Home Bargains stores, with the 22,000 sq ft (2,000 m^{2}) H&M's lower and upper levels occupying the former Woolworths upper and staff-only levels respectively, and the Home Bargains occupying the former Woolworths lower level.

Principal tenants also include JD Sports, Primark, Poundland and W H Smith. River Island and Topshop were notable for their branches being in the same units they had occupied since the early 1990s when the centre was very new, albeit both having each had a full refit in the mid-2000s and a further partial refit in the 2010s to keep them up to date but they have since closed with River Island being replaced with HMV in 2022 and Topshop being replaced with New Look beforehand.

Primark occupies a 30,300 sq ft unit created by amalgamating nine units on the upper and middle levels of the centre, including the former JJB Sports, Currys.digital (pre-Currys PC World rebrand of Dixons) and Dorothy Perkins stores "upstairs", and the former Poundland unit, food/drink kiosk and the upper level of the former T.K. Maxx store "downstairs", T.K. Maxx having moved to Meole Brace retail park.

== Location ==
The centre is accessed directly from the pedestrianised shopping area in Shrewsbury town centre on Pride Hill. Further access can be gained via the dual frontages into the centre offered by W H Smith, Marks & Spencer and H&M. It was joined to the Riverside Mall via a pedestrian walkway and Raven Meadows prior to its closure.

The centre is connected by a pedestrian link directly to council-owned multi-storey parking at 'Raven Meadows' and to the town bus station, which is in turn a short walk to Shrewsbury railway station.

The centre is an unusual example of a vertical mall. Similar to the former Pride Hill Shopping Centre, it is built on the side of a steep hill and around the former outer walls of the nearby medieval castle. This geography and archaeology prevented the centres from being built as one contiguous arcade. Consequently, these centres together occupied seven floors split over two horizontal locations, connected with escalators, lifts and walkway bridges.

== Future ==
There has long been an ambition to physically link the Darwin and Pride Hill shopping centres through the development of vacant land between the sites. Referred to as the 'Gap site', a retail and leisure link development proposed by Morris Property, owners of the land, was granted full planning permission in 2006 prior to being sold to new owners. The onset of economic crisis ensured the scheme was put on hold. Dunedin, promoters of the scheme in 2005, put four branding proposals to the public vote in a high-profile marketing push for the renaming of the present centres following the new development's completion. The reconfigured centre would have been branded 'Castle Gate'.

Chapman Taylor Architects were hired by Shearer Property in October 2010 to devise plans for refurbishment as part of a wider renewal and redevelopment of the estate.

UKCPT produced plans to redevelop a 'new riverside scheme' linking the Riverside with the two shopping centres which were costed at £150M and were approved by Shropshire Council in 2012. However, for commercial reasons the scheme stalled with no work started and Shropshire Council intervened to negotiate and agreed to purchase the centres in 2018 in order to be able to control future planning development of the area in concert with a Big Town Plan partnership in which the council is represented. Their aim was to demolish the existing Riverside Centre and redevelop that site. The Darwin Centre was to become the main shopping site with shops moved from the Pride Hill Centre to create room for a new council headquarters offices within the town centre and the upper level of the latter centre to be redeveloped for leisure purposes including possibly a cinema. By August 2021 the last tenant traders at the Pride Hill Centre had moved out. The Riverside Shopping Centre followed in February 2024 after its last major tenant (Heron Foods under Cooltrader branding) moved out in December the previous year.

== See also ==
- Telford Shopping Centre, a larger shopping centre in nearby Telford
