= Dawley =

Town in Shropshire, England

Coordinates: 52.663°N 2.467°W

- Town and civil parish
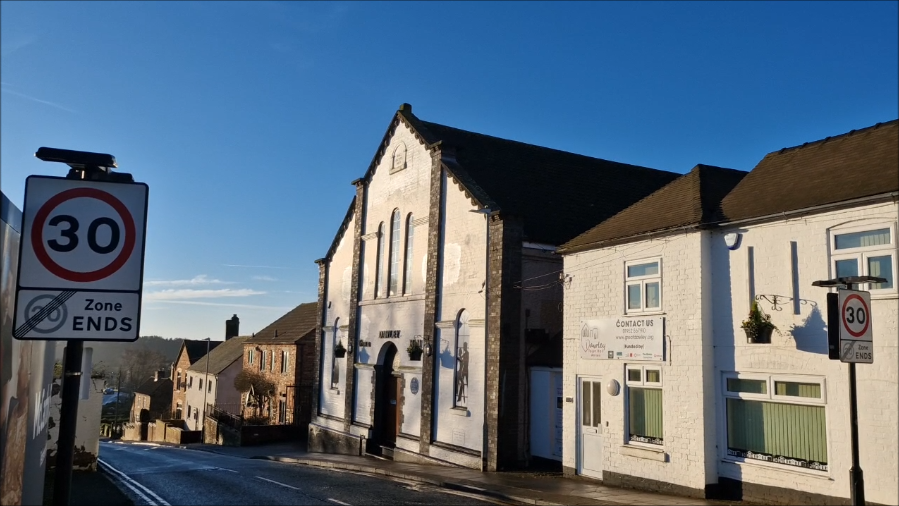
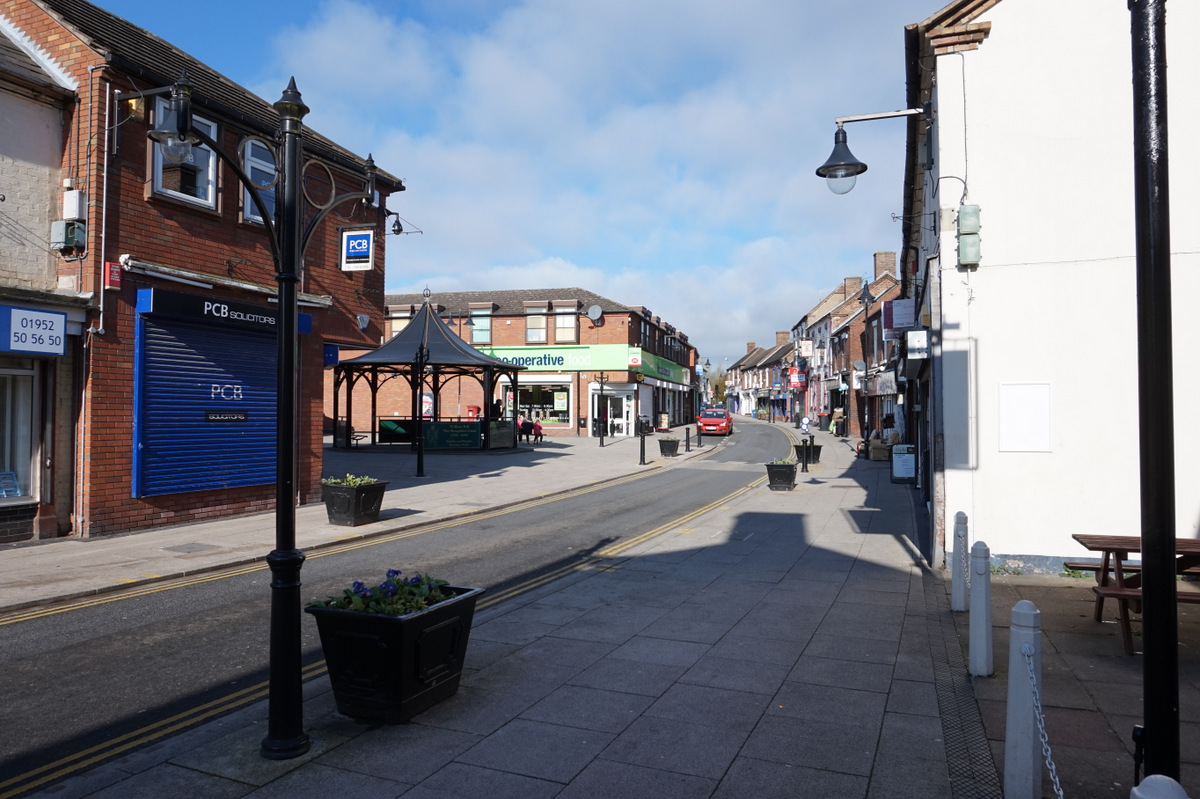
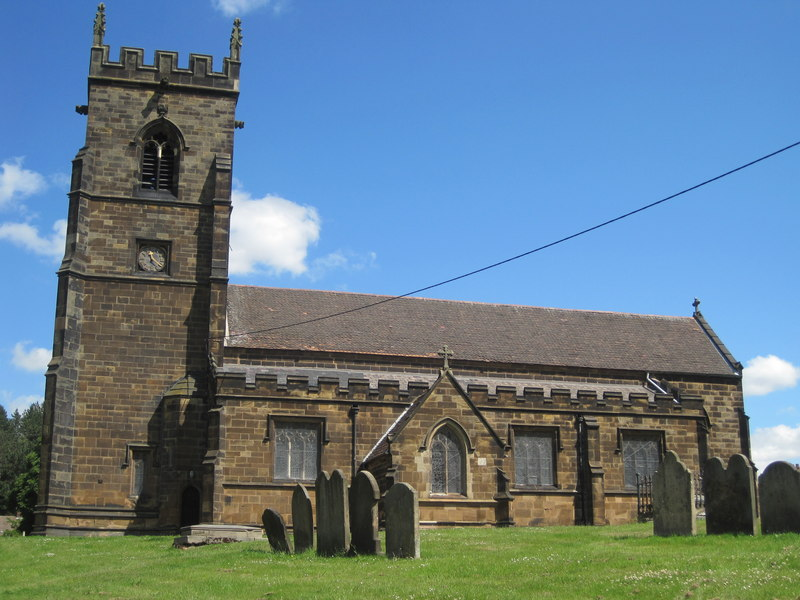
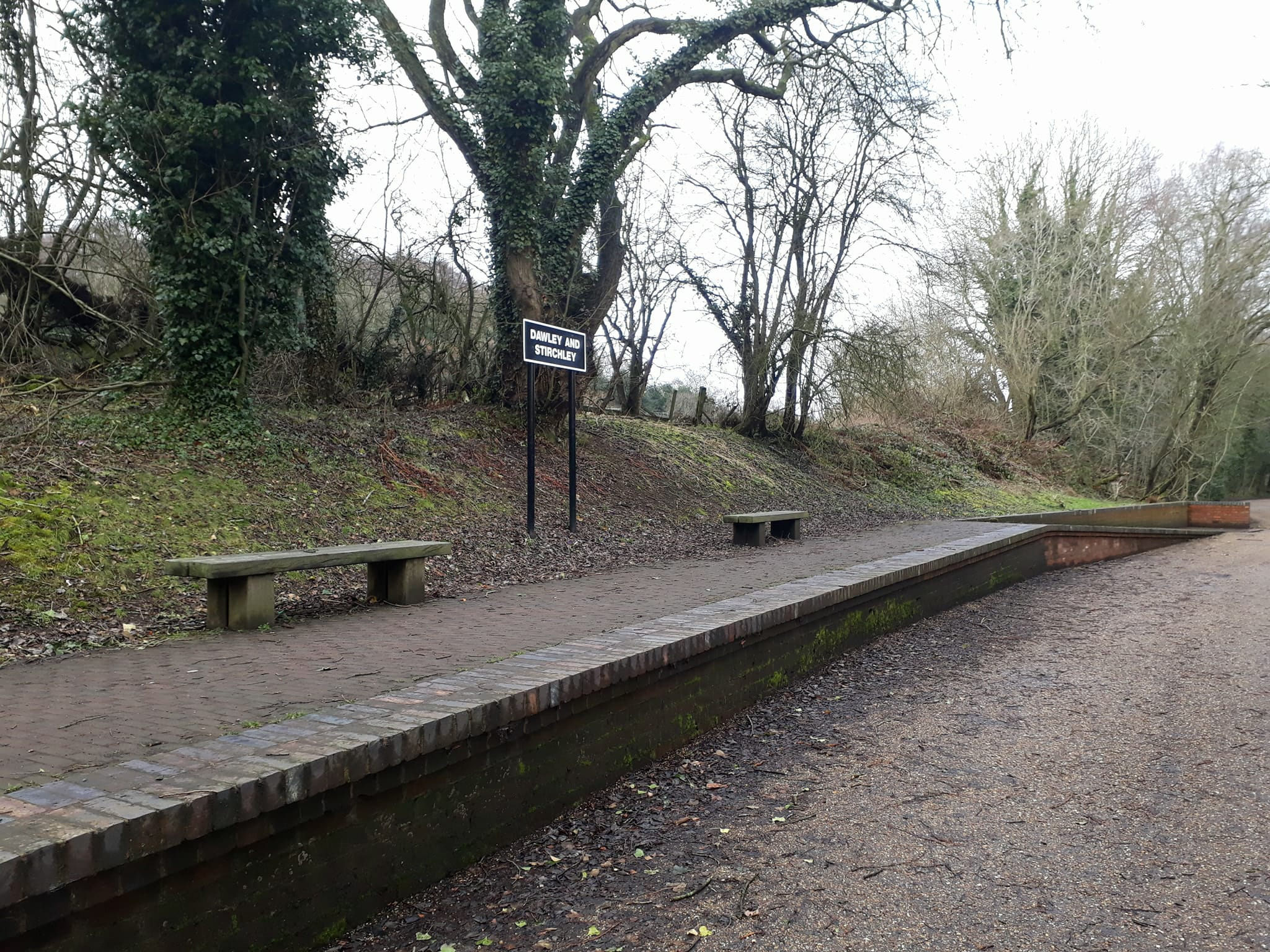
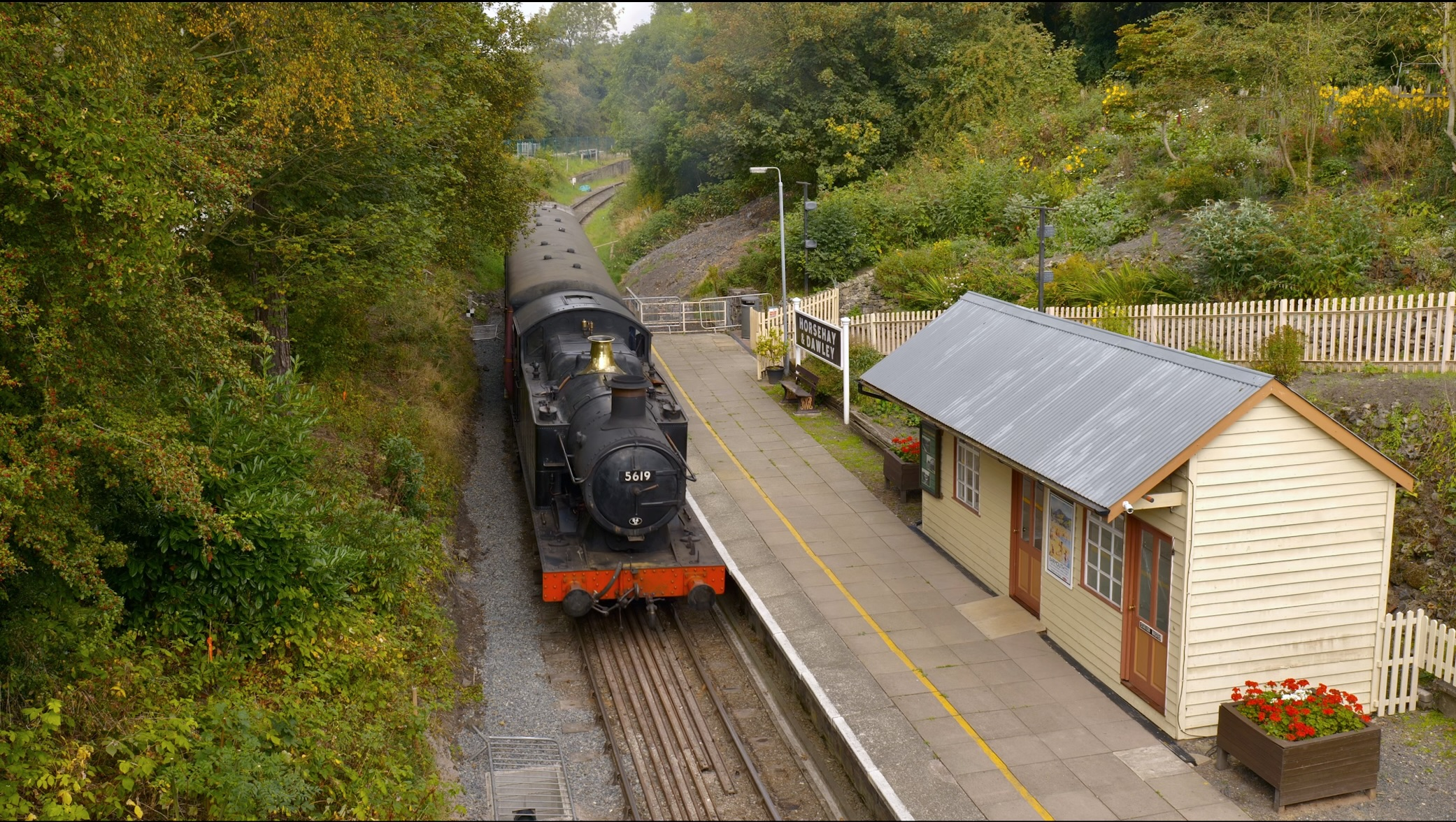
- From the top clockwise: Dawley Town Hall, Holy Trinity Church, Horsehay and Dawley station on the Telford Steam Railway, Dawley and Stirchley Platform on the Silkin Way and High Street

- Location within Shropshire
- Population: 11,399
- OS grid reference: SJ686068
- Civil parish: Great Dawley
- Unitary authority: Telford and Wrekin
- Ceremonial county: Shropshire
- Region: West Midlands
- Country: England
- Sovereign state: United Kingdom
- Areas of the town: List: Dawley Bank (Part); Little Dawley (Part); Malinslee (Part)
- Post town: TELFORD
- Postcode district: TF4
- Dialling code: 01952
- Police: West Mercia
- Fire: Shropshire
- Ambulance: West Midlands
- UK Parliament: Telford
- Website: Official website

Dawley (/dɔːli/ DAW-lee) is a former mining town and civil parish in the borough of Telford and Wrekin, Shropshire, England. It was originally proposed to be the main centre of the 'Dawley New Town' plan in 1963, however it was decided in 1968 to name the new town as 'Telford', after the engineer and road-builder Thomas Telford. Dawley is one of the older settlements in Shropshire, being mentioned in the Domesday Book (1086). It is divided into Dawley Magna ("Great Dawley") and Little Dawley (also shown as Dawley Parva ("Little Dawley") on older maps).

== Etymology ==
The name Dawley comes from Old English meaning woodland clearing associated with a man called Dealla.

== Local government ==
The town's main civil parish is officially called Great Dawley – its parish council is officially Great Dawley Town Council. Dawley Hamlets is a separate civil parish, which covers Little Dawley and other neighbouring villages/suburbs.

In 1894 Dawley became an urban district, the urban district contained the parish of Dawley Magna or Dawley, on 1 April 1974 the district was abolished to form Wrekin, the parish was also abolished. In 1961 the parish had a population of 9558. On 1 April 1988 a parish called "Great Dawley" was formed.

== Railways ==
Unlike the other towns in Telford and Wrekin, Dawley never had its own railway station to serve the town itself. Two railway stations served the town despite being some distance from Dawley itself. The nearest station to the town was Dawley and Stirchley, located roughly 1 mile to the southeast of the town under Stirchley Lane and also served the neighboring village of Stirchley. It opened in 1860 on the Coalport branch line but closed in 1952 along with the line. The trackbed including the platform now form part of the Silkin Way. The other station is in nearby Horsehay, located 1 mile to the southwest of the town. It is on the former Wellington to Craven Arms Line and originally closed in 1962, before being reopened by the Telford Steam Railway. It now serves as a heritage railway station. The nearest mainline station for the town is Telford Central.

== History ==
Dawley is mentioned in the Domesday Book and is therefore one of the older settlements in Shropshire.

There was a castle in Dawley, but it was demolished around 1648. The site is unknown, although the Castle Pools (on the old quarry site) and Castle Ironworks (built by the Darby family, one of whom commissioned the world-famous Iron Bridge) possibly indicate the general area where it may have stood. Prior to the landscaping that followed the creation of Telford New Town, extensive ruins were detectable next to the Castle Pools and are shown on old maps as being the location of the castle, but, in the 1980s, the whole area was buried under thick topsoil and planted with trees. Ironbridge is a short distance away.

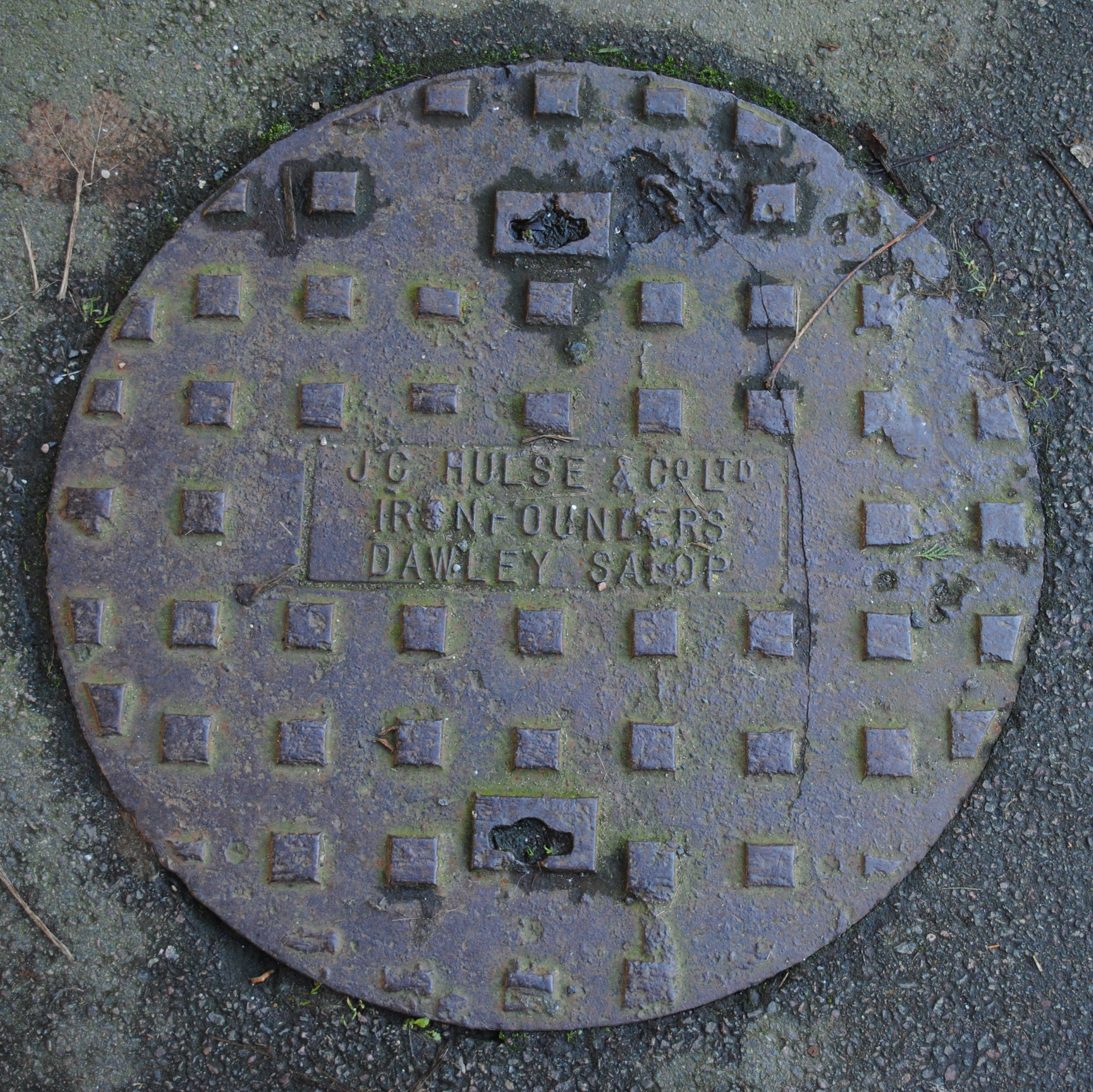
Cast iron manhole cover in Birmingham, made by J. C. Hulse of Dawley, who were in business there from 1947 to 1976

For over three centuries, Dawley was a mining town, both for coal and ironstone. Clay extraction, for local industrial-pipe factories, brickyards and the pottery industry, have been major influences on the landscape. Mining had an important impact on the local culture. In 1821, production at Dawley's ironworks of was halted by striking miners in protest at lowering of their wages. Many of the workers in Dawley joined a larger group of protesters in what came to be known as the Cinderloo Uprising. In 1872, the Springwell Pit Disaster resulted in the deaths of eight men and boys.

Prior to large-scale levelling as part of the development of Telford New Town, the area was covered by clay mounds and large clay pits that dominated the landscape, to the extent that they formed points of reference for the locals. There is still a local clay-pipe factory in the adjacent Doseley village; grey clay predominates on the immediate outskirts of Dawley.

The adjacent village of Horsehay was the site of a bridge and later a crane fabrication factory that exported around the world. The Victoria Falls Bridge is wrongly claimed to have been built there. Telford Steam Railway trust is located across the road from the former factory site.

Dawley Town Hall opened as a temperance hall, in 1873.

On 7 June 2010, Dawley had become subject to a lot of media attention because some locals had recreated the 'Hollywood' sign on a noticeable bank on Paddock Mount but with Dawley instead of Hollywood. The Shropshire Star had a full-page spread article on that day's evening edition to honour the effort made by the locals. As of midday on 8 June, over 1000 people had joined a Facebook group showing support for the sign, acknowledging the efforts of its creators, and in protest against the controversial redevelopment of the mount to move the Phoenix Academy (now the Telford Langley School) there.

Dawley is known for its dialect, which includes some quite unique words, including "bist", presumably from the German meaning "are". However, the dialect is largely lost. Along with the dialect were various conventions and traditions, notably the "pig on the wall". Traditionally, Dawley residents would show their support for The Dawley Prize Band or other civic marches by placing their pigs on their walls. The pig also features in the dialect, with a romantic phrase apparently being "I wudna swop thee for a big black pig!"

== Geography ==
Dawley and Stirchley shown within Telford in Grey.

Dawley has a street-market every Friday. Dawley town centre consists of a single pedestrianised street that was previously the main route from Bridgnorth in the south to Wellington in the north. The area around Dawley, not covered by Telford New Town, is rural and provides extensive opportunities for walking. The Ironbridge Gorge and The Wrekin are both pleasant walks from Dawley.

On the northern edge of Dawley is Malinslee where St. Leonards church stands. The design of St. Leonards, a slightly irregular octagon, is credited to Thomas Telford. Other churches supposedly influenced by Thomas Telford during his work in Shropshire are at nearby Madeley and Bridgnorth.

== Education ==
There are seven primary schools in the Dawley area, and a comprehensive secondary school, Telford Langley School. There are two special schools in Dawley: Queensway South campus (formerly Mount Gilbert School) and Southall School.

== Notable people ==
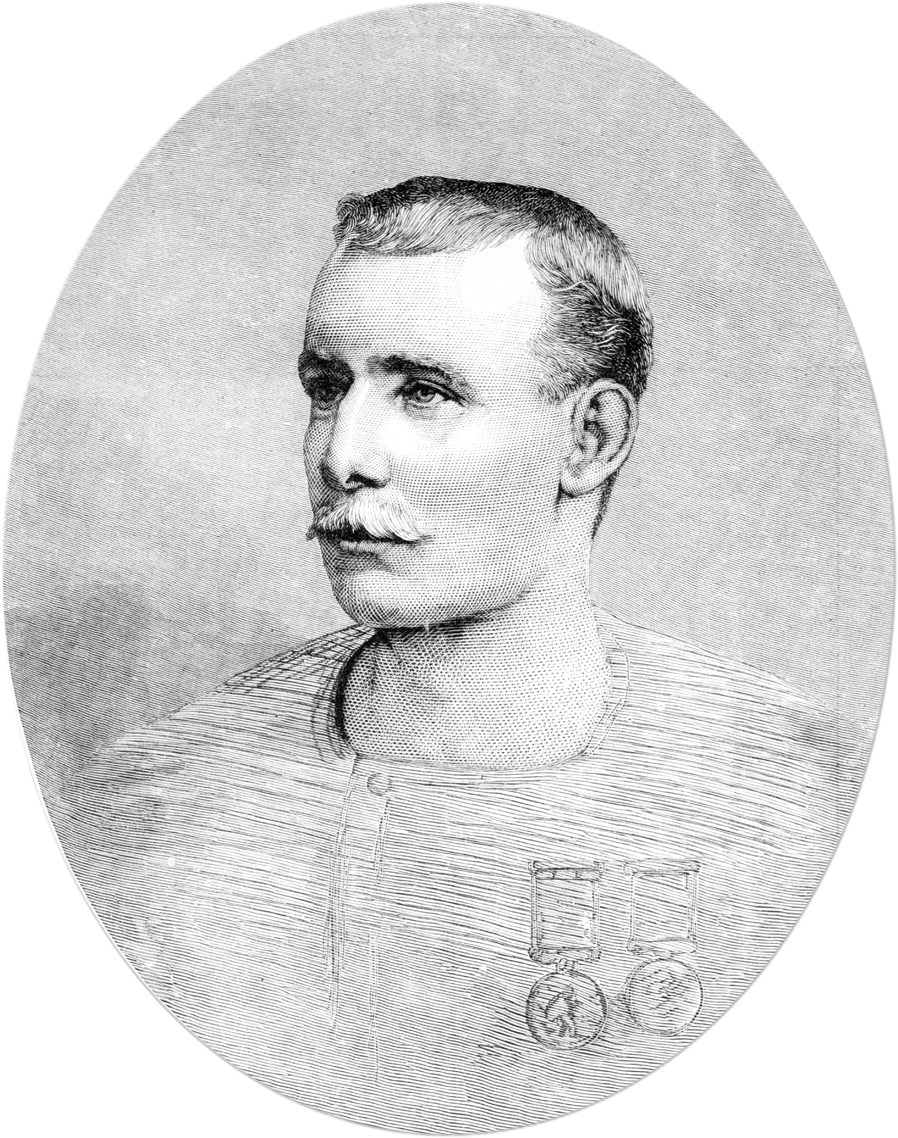
Captain Matthew Webb, 1883

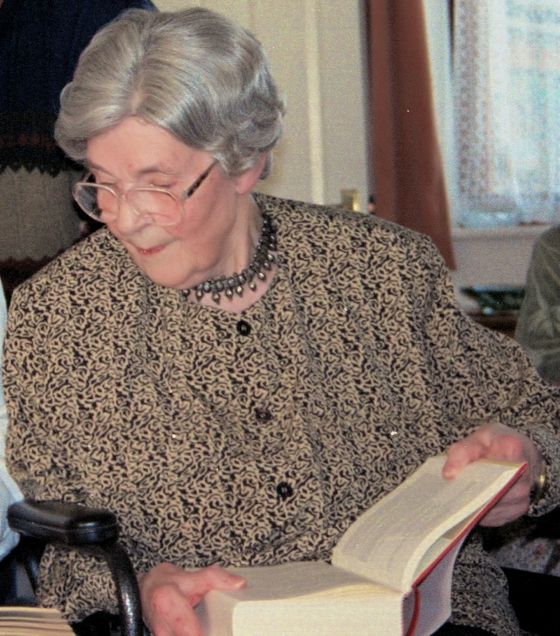
Ellis Peters, 1995

- Nancy Bailey (1863–1913), English indexer
- William Ball (1795–1852), the Shropshire Giant, was a nineteenth-century iron puddler and giant.
- Thomas Botfield (1762-1843), metallurgist, geologist and inventor, was born at Dawley.
- Paul Hendy (born 1966), TV presenter, script-writer, novelist, director and filmmaker was born at Dawley.
- Edith Pargeter (1913-1995), using her pen name Ellis Peters, she wrote the Brother Cadfael novels; she went to school in Dawley. She grew up with her family in King Street, Dawley and published her first novel in 1936 while working at a chemist's shop in the town. Numerous roads in Aqueduct, such as Cadfael Drive and Ellis Peters Drive, are 'themed' after her.
- Samuel Peploe (1667-1752), later Bishop of Chester, was a native of Dawley Parva, where he was baptised
- John Poole Sandlands (1838-1915), clergyman, naturopath and vegetarian activist, was born in Dawley.
- Joseph Simpson (1909-1968) born in Dawley, was Commissioner of Police of the Metropolis, 1958 / 1968.
- Albert Stanley (1863-1915), Liberal, later Labour politician, MP for N.W.Staffs, was born in Dark Lane, Dawley.

=== Sport ===
- Captain Matthew Webb (1848–1883), the first man to swim the English Channel – his monument stands on the High Street. Legend suggests that at the parade in Webb's honour that was held on his return, a pig stood up against a wall to watch. Two roads in the town are named after him, Captain Webb Drive and Webb Crescent, as is the Captain Webb Primary School.
- William Foulke (1874–1916) goalkeeper, was born at Dawley, played 355 games mainly for Sheffield United.
- Joe Butler (1879–1941), football goalkeeper played 513 games, was born at Dawley Bank.
- Graham Bailey (1920-2024), footballer, played 53 games for Huddersfield Town and Sheffield United, centenarian last surviving professional player from the 1930s, was born at Dawley.
- Roy Pritchard (1925-1993), footballer, played 247 games incl. 202 for Wolves and at the 1949 FA Cup Final, was born at Dawley.
- Thomas Nicholls (1931-2021), boxer, lived at Brandlee, Dawley when he appeared at the 1952 and 1956 Summer Olympics.
- Eddie Garbett (born 1949), footballer played 200 games mainly for Barrow and Stockport County, was born at Dawley.
- Dalian Atkinson (1968-2016), footballer, played 246 games, mainly for Aston Villa; was living in Little Dawley when he died.

== See also ==
- Listed buildings in Great Dawley
- Listed buildings in Dawley Hamlets
- Shropshire Revolution – American football Team, based in Dawley
