= Listed buildings in Great Dawley =

Great Dawley is a civil parish in the district of Telford and Wrekin, Shropshire, England. It contains seven listed buildings that are recorded in the National Heritage List for England. Of these, one is at Grade II*, the middle of the three grades, and the others are at Grade II, the lowest grade. The parish contains the town of Dawley, and all the listed buildings are in the town and its suburb of Malinslee; these consist of two churches, shops, a house, a public house and a memorial in the form of a drinking fountain.

== Key ==
Grade	Criteria
II*	Particularly important buildings of more than special interest
II	Buildings of national importance and special interest

== Buildings ==
Name and location	Photograph	Date	Notes	Grade
St Leonard's Church; 52.66985°N 2.46133°W		1804–05	The church, which was designed by Thomas Telford, is built in sandstone with a hipped slate roof. It has an elongated octagonal external plan, and a west tower. The tower has four stages, the ground floor is rusticated, it contains clock faces, and has a parapet. The body of the church has two storeys with round-arched windows in the upper storeys and windows with flat heads below.	II*
11, 11A and 15 Burton Street; 52.66448°N 2.47010°W	—	Early 19th century	A pair of brick shops with a slate roof, three storeys and four bays. In the ground floor are 19th-century shop fronts with pilasters and entablatures, and between them is a round-arched passageway. In the middle floor of No. 11 are modern casement windows, and the other windows are sashes with rusticated lintels.	II
Elephant and Castle Public House; 52.66437°N 2.46986°W		Early 19th century	Th public house is in brick with a tile roof, two storeys and three bays, the centre and the corners projecting forward. The windows in the upper floor are sashes with rusticated lintels, and in the ground floor they are modern replacements. The central doorway has pilasters and an entablature.	II
Prospect House; 52.66420°N 2.47805°W	—	Early 19th century	A brick house with a tile roof that has a parapet and moulded stone coping. The central doorway has a rectangular fanlight and a pediment on brackets. There is a bay window with a tented roof, and the other windows are sashes with slightly arched lintels and keyblocks.	II
16 and 17 Burton Street; 52.66443°N 2.46994°W	—	Early to mid 19th century	A pair of brick shops with a slate roof, two storeys and four bays. In the ground floor is a 19th-century shop front with pilasters and an entablature. The upper floor contains one blind window and three sash windows, all with panelled lintels.	II
Holy Trinity Church; 52.65516°N 2.46379°W		1844–45	The church, which is in Perpendicular style, is built in sandstone. It consists of a nave, north and south aisles, a south baptistry, a chancel with a north vestry, and a west tower. The tower has diagonal buttresses and an embattled parapet with pinnacles. There are also embattled parapets along the aisles.	II
Memorial to Captain Webb; 52.66358°N 2.46684°W	—	1909	The memorial to Captain Webb, the first person to swim the English Channel unaided, is in the form of a drinking fountain, and stands near a road junction. It is in stone and has a plinth, bowls with lions' heads fountains, panelled sides, and pedimented gables. It carries medallions and inscriptions, and on the top is a modern lamp.	II
