= Castle Gate, Cornwall =

Hamlet in west Cornwall, England

Coordinates: 50.15403°N 5.51582°W

Castle Gate is a hamlet in west Cornwall, England, United Kingdom. It is situated approximately three miles (4.5 km) north-northeast of Penzance at OS grid ref SW491342 in a former mining area.

== Cornish wrestling ==
Joseph Martin was originally from Castle Gate and became Cornish wrestling champion of Toronto, Canada in 1906.
