= Springwell Pit disaster =

1872 Mine shaft disaster

- Date: 12 June 1872
- Location: Dawley, Shropshire England.; 52.670°N 2.466°W
- Type: Coal mine disaster
- Cause: Chain snap
- Deaths: 8

The Springwell Pit disaster occurred on 6 December 1872 at Springwell coal mining pit near Dawley, Shropshire (now part of Telford).

Miners at the pit would grab hold of a chain running the depth of the mine shaft and be hoisted 150 ft to the surface. On this day, eight miners clung to the chain. When 50 ft from the base of the lower part of the chain snapped, causing the miners to fall to the base of the shaft, before the chain, estimated to weigh 1 tonne, landed on top of them. All of them were killed instantly, except one, who died shortly after being brought to the surface.

== Memorial ==
The miners' funeral attracted large crowds at Dawley's Holy Trinity Church. The miners were buried in a communal grave and a large memorial is still visible in the church yard today.

A new memorial, bearing the names and a brief history of the disaster has now been erected in the town centre, outside the Methodist church and supermarket.

In 2008 Dawley History Group organised a memorial service to try to get the disaster recognised by local people, whose families are now largely from the Black Country following the development of Telford New Town.

== Victims' names & ages ==
- John Davies (19)
- Edward Jones (21)
- Isaiah Skelton (15)
- Allen Wyke (20)
- Robert Smith (18)
- William Bailey (21)
- John Parker (22)
- John Yale (21)
