= Telford Shopping Centre =

Telford Centre
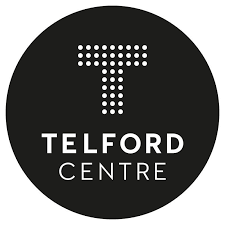

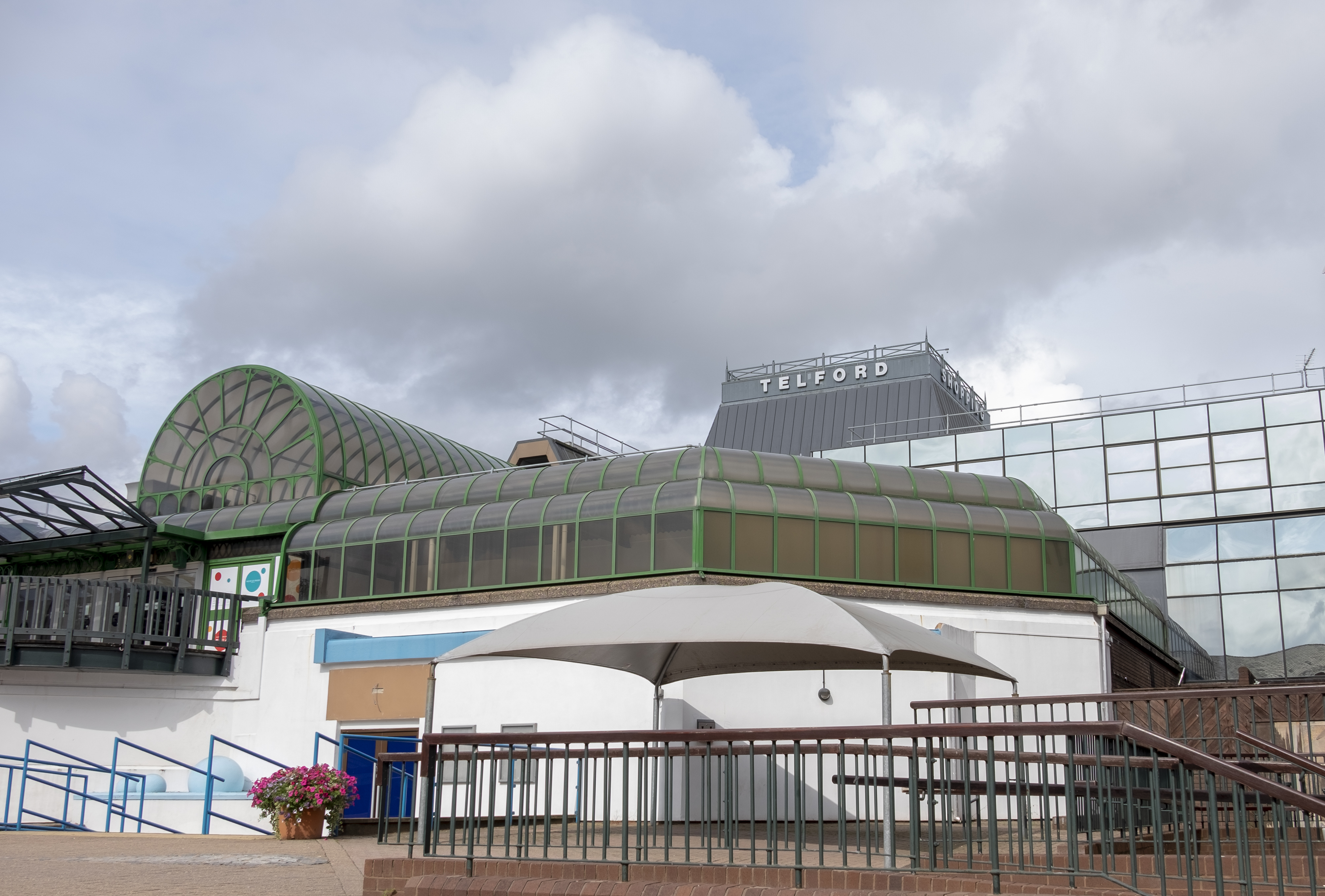
- The Telford Centre in 2019
- Location: Telford, Shropshire; England
- Coordinates: 52.677032°N 2.447161°W
- Opened: 1973
- Developer: Telford Development Corporation
- Manager: Glynn Morrow
- Owner: Sovereign Land & Orion
- Num. of stores: Over 160
- Num. of anchor tenants: 4 M&S, Primark, Frasers, Sports Direct
- Floor area: 100,000 m² (1,076,391 ft²)
- Floors: 1
- Parking: 5,065 spaces
- Website: telfordcentre.com

Telford Centre, previously branded as Telford Shopping Centre, is a 52-acre (210,000 m^{2}) indoor shopping centre in Telford, Shropshire, England, housing the streets North Sherwood Street, Sherwood Square, Sherwood Street, Wyre Hall, Sherwood Row, Southwater, The Border, Kielder Square, New Street, Chase Telford, Wrekin Square, New Row, Dean Street, Dean Square and Ashdown Row.

== Information ==
The shopping centre is located in the geographical and economic centre of Telford, on land which was previously undeveloped. The trustees of the shopping centre are registered offshore for tax purposes. It is the largest shopping area in the ceremonial county of Shropshire, being located roughly equidistant between Shrewsbury and the West Midlands conurbation. With a floor area of 100,000 m^{2}, the centre is one of the twenty five largest in the country, and has an average footfall of 300,000 per week, equating to 15 million per annum. The centre is located on a 50-acre (200,000 m^{2}) site, containing over 175 stores. The term Telford Town Centre is often used to refer to the shopping centre alone, but the town centre also encompasses the town park and surrounding areas of central Telford. The centre's former logo featured The Iron Bridge, of nearby Ironbridge, a UNESCO World Heritage Site.

In 2008 the centre was ranked as 14th best in the country by CACI.

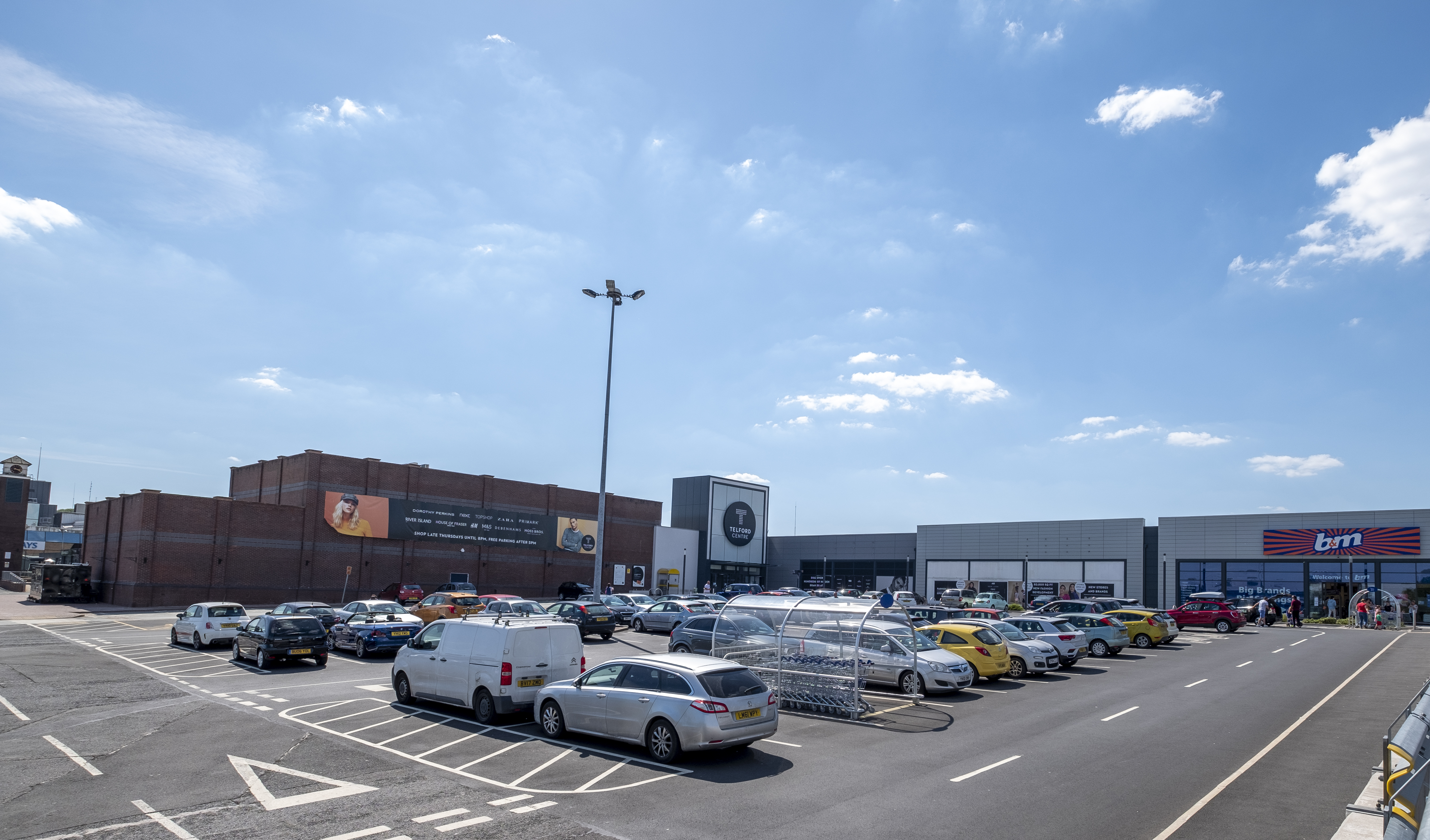
Telford Centre in 2020

== History ==
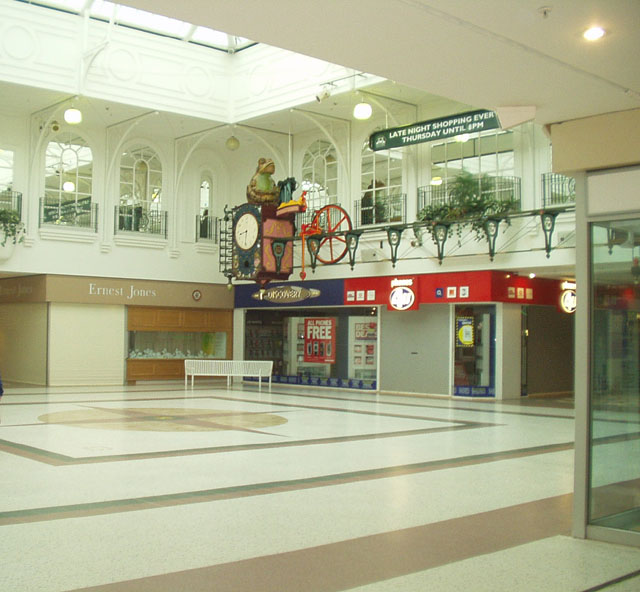
Sherwood Square in early morning. The Frog Clock is located in the upper area. Designed by Kit Williams and engineered and constructed by Andrew Beasant.

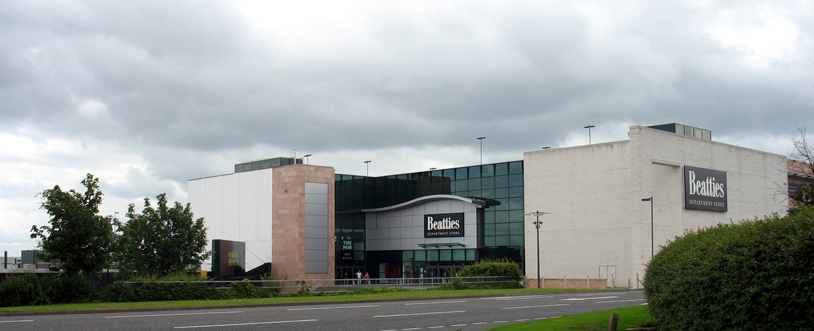
The Beatties department store located at the west end of the centre, before rebranding to House of Fraser in August 2007.

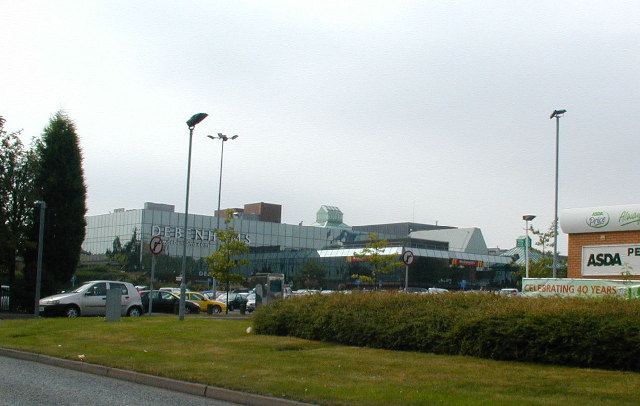
The branches of Debenhams, (now Flip Out), and the former Asda.

The site for the Telford Town Centre is on 186 acres of reclaimed mine wastes, old brickworks, and the hamlet of Dark Lane.

The shopping centre was opened in October 1973, and longest standing retailers in the shopping centre are Boots and F. Hinds jewellers. The largest store during the mid to late 1970's was the Phase 1 Carrefour supermarket. It was expanded in 1981 to include extra shopping areas – Phase 2 was officially opened by Queen Elizabeth II in late November 1981.

Phase 3 of the shopping centre opened in 1987 with Marks & Spencer coming to the centre. Telford Development Corporation decided to sell the shopping centre in June 1989 with an asking price in excess of £80 million as part of the winding up of the development corporation.

The centre came under larger development when it was purchased by the Universities Superannuation Scheme group in 1990. Thenceforth, a refurbishment program was undertaken, including the addition of large roof windows, which admitted more light into the centre. USS also created the Sherwood Square area and added the popular Frog Clock.

By 2001 the centre had 160 stores. By 2006, the centre had approximately 180. This growth can be attributed to the addition of an area known as the 'New Row Mall', which opened in September 2004. This 14,000 m^{2} extension to the west end of the centre added the 7,400 m^{2} anchor store Beatties, which was later taken over by House of Fraser in August 2007, and then Frasers and Sports Direct in May 2023 (Frasers) and September 2023 (Sports Direct), with the existing standalone Sports Direct store in the shopping centre, (located in the former JJB Sports unit), closing permanently. Since Beatties opened on 5 September 2003, car park use has increased on average by between 10 and 12 percent. Other notable stores were added to New Row Mall at this time, including Zara, Costa Coffee and River Island. Zara permanently closed in January 2024.

Current anchors of the centre include Frasers, Sports Direct, Primark and Marks and Spencer. Other notable stores include Boots, H&M, New Look and Next.

Sherwood Square in Telford Shopping Centre is host to the "Telford Time Machine", a large animated feature clock spanning most of the width of the square. This square often plays host to small exhibitions, mini-markets, Santa's Grotto, a children's plastic "ice rink" and a variety of other events.

The ten-screen cinema originally opened in October 1988. In 2005, the UCI Cinema was refurbished and rebranded as Odeon. This cinema is located to the west of the centre, across the underpass connecting House of Fraser to the vehicle parking areas.

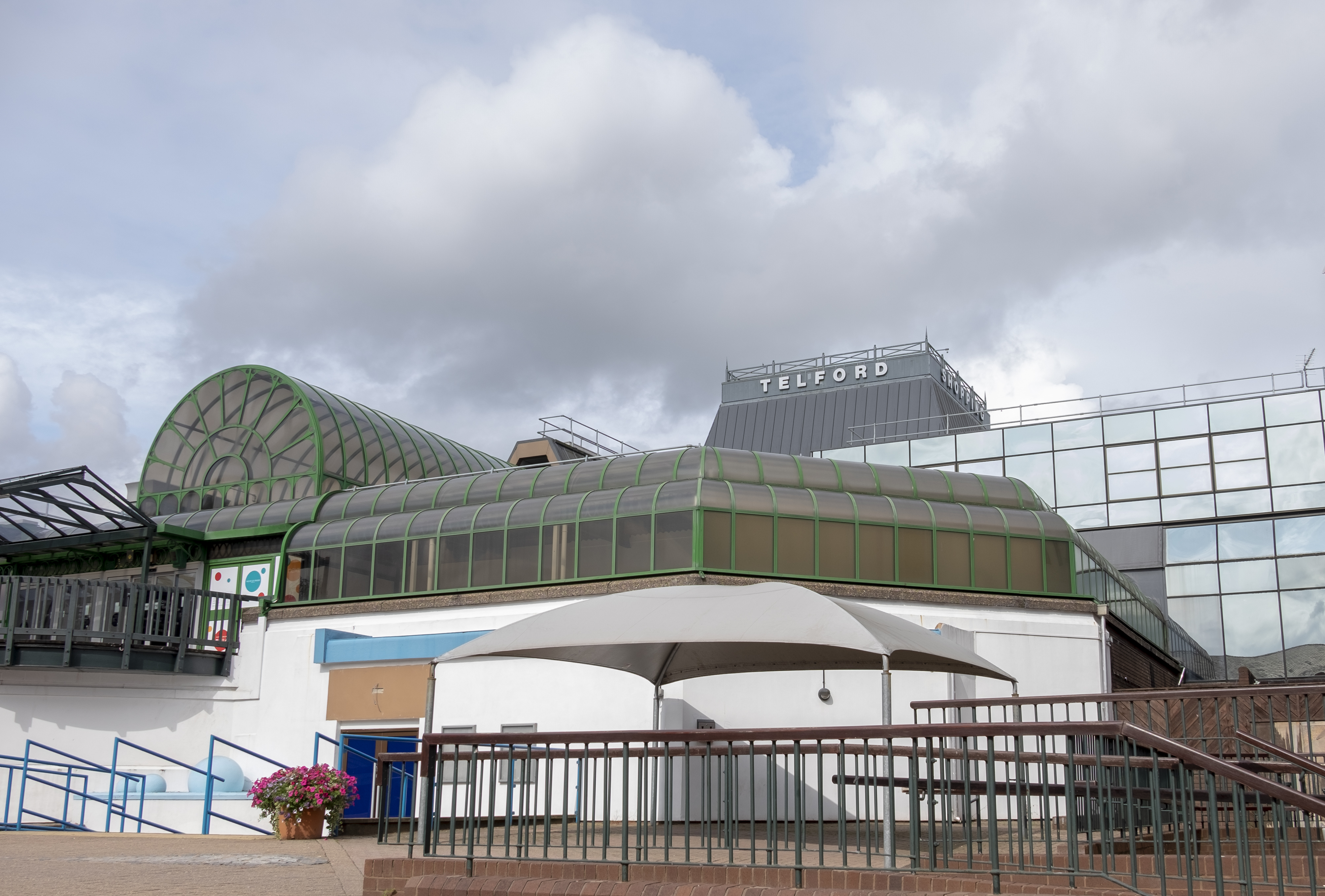
Telford Centre 2019

In 2006, the centre won the five-star 'Loo of the Year' award due to the cleanliness and access to its toilet facilities.

In June 2007, USS sold the shopping centre to Hark Group and Apollo Real Estate (collectively Hark & Apollo) for £442 million.

== Expansion ==
An extension for the Primark store took place in 2009, which involved an extension equal to three times the previous retail area of that store. The number of parking bays increased to approximately 4,000 spaces, and new bus stops were located around The Round walkway. There were also plans, that have since been shelved to transfer control of the Ice Rink from the local council to a private operator and move it into an extension of the centre. The construction of a new Asda supermarket outside the centre into a new building just outside the circular walkway is under way despite the proposed move of Asda being resisted by Hark & Apollo.

On 11 March 2008 it was announced, as part of Hark & Apollo's plan to revitalise town centre trade, that the anchor stores would stay open until 8 pm, as opposed to 6 pm. The supermarket Asda also extended opening times until 10 pm.

Construction began on the triple-size extension to the Primark store in November 2008, which was finished by summer of 2009.

In 2010, there were further developments from a leisure perspective adjacent to JD Wetherspoon, consisting of a nightclub named 'Crush', a bar, restaurant and a takeaway unit in the Grange Central area of the Shopping Centre.

In October 2012, Sovereign Land joined the partnership following the departure of Hark Group.

In 2013, a £200 million expansion plan for the shopping centre was announced, which included enhanced pedestrian access to the centre with improved links to surrounding areas. The proposal was for the 1 million sq ft Telford Shopping Centre to increase in size by up to 80 percent, with a net increase of almost 400,000 sq ft of retail and 250,000 sq ft of restaurants, cafés, bars, and other eateries as well as a cinema and hotel.

Contrary to popular belief, the Southwater area of Telford town centre, completed in 2014, was a project led and funded by Telford and Wrekin Council, and not the owners of the shopping centre. The official opening ceremony on 18 October 2014 included live music and fireworks. The area contains a refurbished library, various chain restaurants, a Cineworld IMAX Cinema, bowling alley/arcade and a new multi-story car park.

The development of a 'Northern Quarter' on the former Asda store site began in November 2015, which would be followed by a 26,500 square feet (2,460 m^{2}) 'Southern Quarter'.

Development of the Northern Quarter had finished by 2018. Both B&M and Aldi opened their stores, and additional retailers including JYSK and Poundstretcher have also opened in the Northern Quarter.

As part of a £55 million redevelopment, the centre saw a redevelopment of the Fashion Quarter and improvements to existing parts such as new lighting and signage. Part of the redevelopment was moving the existing Next store within the centre to a new 30,000sq ft store which opened on 14 September 2019. New Look opened its 16,000sq ft store on 26 September. A rebrand of the branding of the centre was also implemented alongside the completion of the expansion, with a new term and the shopping centre renamed to Telford Centre.

== Impact ==
There has been some controversy amongst traders and other local people in other parts of Telford, such as Wellington, Oakengates, Madeley and Dawley about the impact of the centre on local traders.

In a typical week, the centre has around 300,000 visitors, rising to over half a million in the Christmas run-up. The centre is also notably busier at the weekends.

The centre also feasibly draws a significant amount of trade from Shrewsbury, with the centre only being approximately 25 minutes' (approx. 15 miles (24 km)) drive up the A5 dual-carriageway/M54 motorway. Shrewsbury, being a historic town, has much more limited access to its medium-sized shopping centre, the Darwin Shopping Centre, and car parking charges are significantly higher than in Telford.

== Transport ==
Telford Town Centre Bus Station
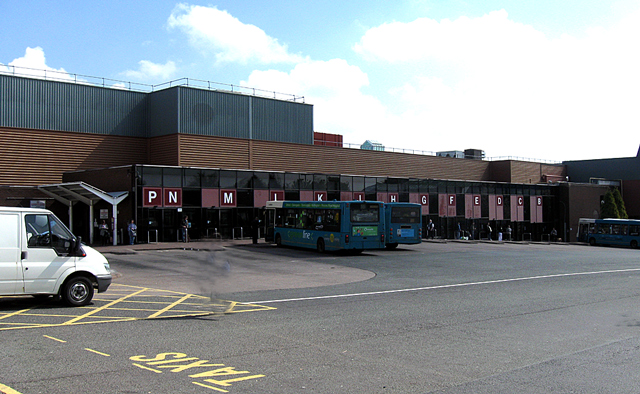
- Telford Town Centre Bus Station prior to the 2017 remodelling.

General information
- Other names: Telford Bus Station
- Location: Telford; Shropshire; England
- Owner: Telford and Wrekin Borough Council
- Operator: Arriva Midlands
- Bus routes: 1, 2, 3, 3A, 4, 5, 5A, 5E, 6, 7, 8, 8A, X10, X10A, 96, 96A, 113, 114, 891
- Bus stands: 13 (A - J) (There is no Stand I, as to not cause confusion with J or L)
- Bus operators: Arriva Midlands; Banga Buses; National Express; Select Bus Services
- Connections: Wellington; Sutton Hill; Oakengates; Priorslee; Lawley; Much Wenlock; Shrewsbury; Newport; Wolverhampton; Stafford

Construction
- Accessible: Lift access to and from shopping centre and bus station.

History
- Opened: Opened in 1973, Remodelled in 2017
Location

From the east the area is best reached via junction 5 of the M54 motorway and from the west via the A5, which leads onto the M54. Telford Central railway station is within walking distance. Regular bus services run to Shrewsbury, Newport, Stafford and Wolverhampton.

Car parking charges were introduced to the car parks surrounding the shopping centre in 2004. The centre has large car parks, providing approximately 4,000 parking spaces. It is estimated that almost 90% of shoppers in the centre arrive by car.
