= Coalport East railway station =

Former railway station in England

Coalport East
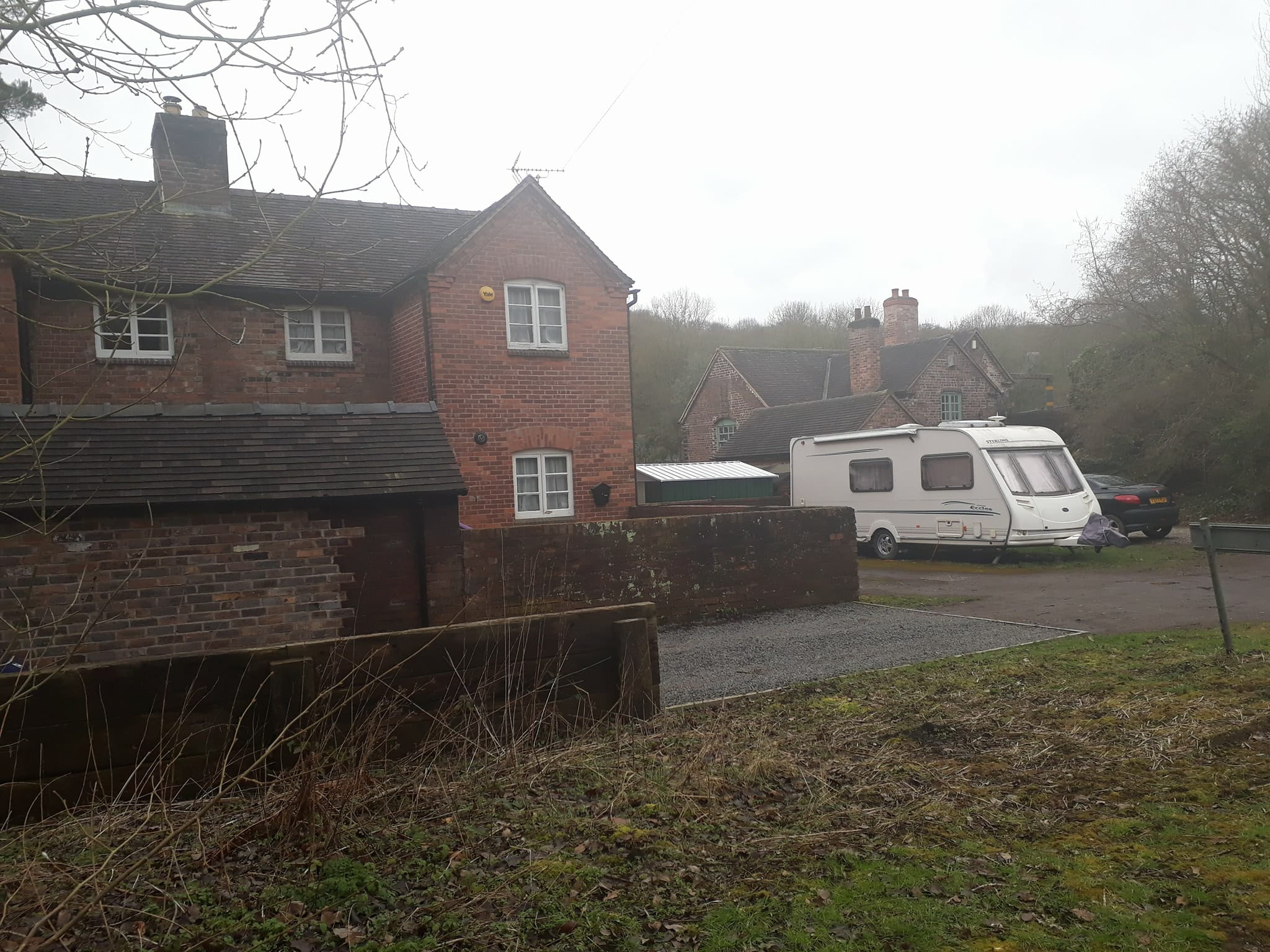
- Coalport East station in 2018

General information
- Location: Coalport; England
- Coordinates: 52.6164°N 2.4416°W
- Grid reference: SJ701021
- Platforms: 1

Other information
- Status: Disused

History
- Pre-grouping: London and North Western Railway
- Post-grouping: London, Midland and Scottish Railway

Key dates
- 10 June 1861: Opened as Coalport
- ?: Renamed Coalport East
- 2 June 1952: Closed for passengers
- 1960: closed for freight
Location

Coalport East was a London and North Western Railway station at Coalport, situated on the north bank of the River Severn. It formed the terminus of the Coalport Branch Line which ran from Hadley Junction near Oakengates on the LNWR Stafford to Shrewsbury Line.

== History ==
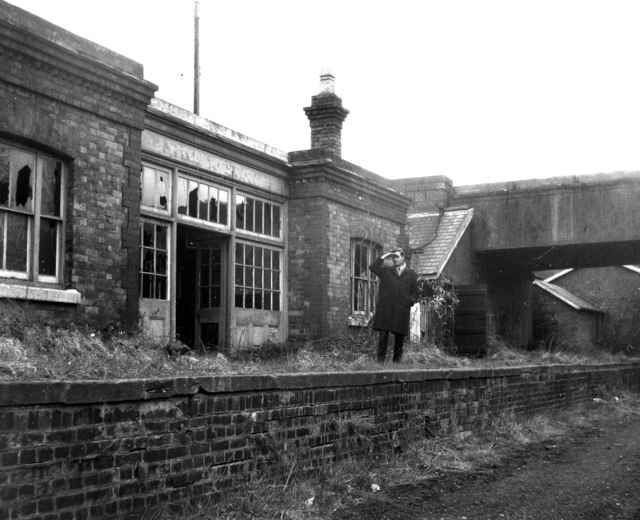
The closed station in 1963

The station was originally named ‘Coalport’ at opening on 10 June 1861. It was later renamed ‘Coalport East’ to avoid confusion with the Severn Valley Railway Coalport station which opened on the opposite bank of the river Severn in 1862.

The station was host to a LMS camping coach from 1934 to 1939.

Coalport East closed to passengers on 2 June 1952, and to freight traffic in 1960.

Preceding station	Disused railways	Following station
Terminus	London and North Western Railway; Coalport Branch Line	Madeley Market; Line closed, station closed
