= Coalport branch line =

Disused railway line in Shropshire, England

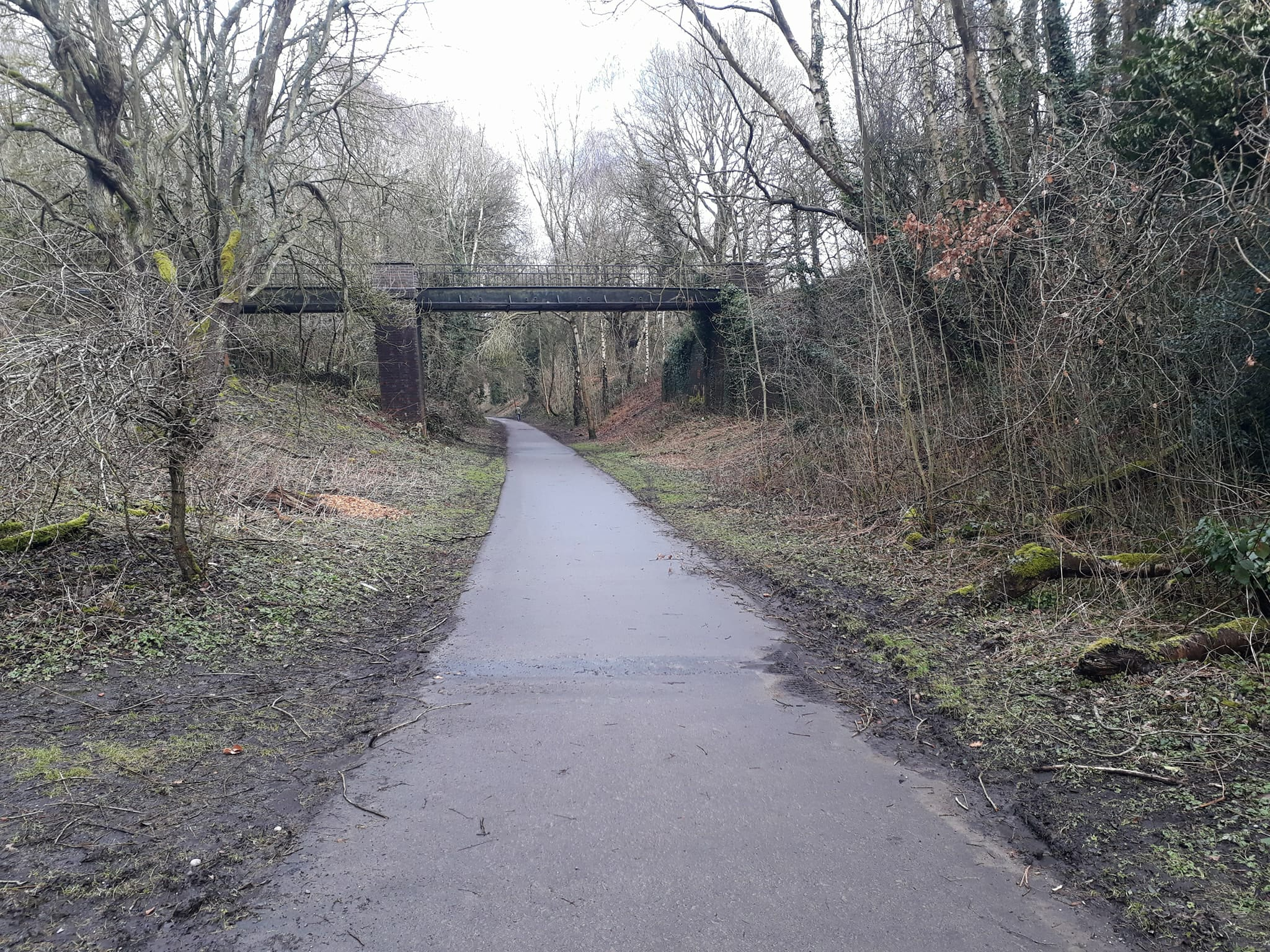
The Silkin Way near Malins Lee and Dawley and Stirchley

The Coalport branch line was a standard gauge London and North Western Railway branch line in Shropshire, England, which ran between Hadley Junction near Oakengates on the Stafford to Shrewsbury line and a terminus at Coalport East railway station on the north bank of the River Severn at Coalport.

== Commercial history ==
The 8-mile (13 km) branch line opened on 17 June 1861. Passenger services were little used, with the line's existence being mainly supported by freight traffic. There were sidings at locations including Blists Hill Ironworks and the Coalport China factory of John Rose and Co.

The line was closed to passengers in 1952 and to regular freight on 5 December 1960, the line to Stirchley finally closed to even sporadic traffic on 6 July 1964.

== Preservation ==
On 9 April 1980 the 2 ft (610 mm) gauge Telford Town Tramway was opened by the Reverend W. Awdry on the trackbed of the Coalport branch alongside Randlay Pool in Telford Town Park. The tramway only lasted a few years before it closed in the mid-1980s. The tram has since been preserved by the Telford Steam Railway running on its own circular track by Horsehay Pool.

The interchange siding at Blists Hill now forms part of the Ironbridge Gorge Museum Trust’s Blists Hill Victorian Town site.

Four miles of the former trackbed now form part of the Silkin Way, a cycling and walking route managed by Telford and Wrekin Council. It runs south of the former Malins Lee railway station to just north of the former Coalport East railway station.
