= Woodside, Telford =

Area in Madeley, Shropshire, England

Coordinates: 52.6393°N 2.4648°W

Woodside
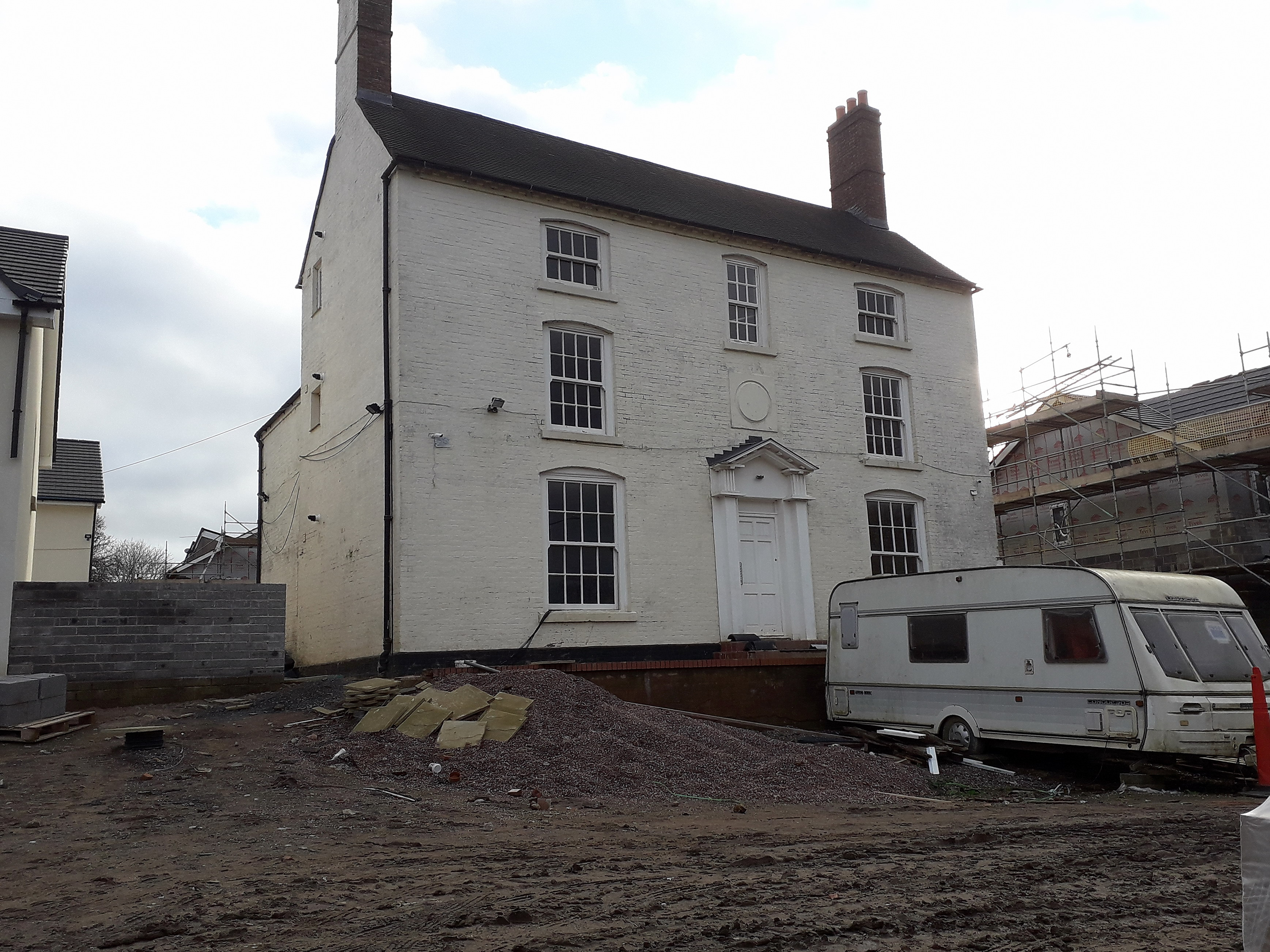

- Location within Shropshire
- Area: 1.431 km^{2} (0.553 sq mi)
- Population: 7,597 (2021 census)
  - Density: 5,309/km^{2} (13,750/sq mi)
- Civil parish: Madeley
- Unitary authority: Telford and Wrekin
- Ceremonial county: Shropshire
- Region: West Midlands
- Country: England
- Sovereign state: United Kingdom
- Police: West Mercia
- Fire: Shropshire
- Ambulance: West Midlands

Woodside is a residential area within the civil parish of Madeley in Shropshire, England. It is also the name of an electoral ward of both Madeley Town Council and the borough of Telford and Wrekin. The population of the borough ward at the 2021 Census is given as 7,597.

In 1963, Dawley New Town (soon to be known as Telford) was designated in the area surrounding towns and villages such as Ironbridge, Dawley and Wellington. The intention was to bring jobs to the area as well as houses to accommodate the thousands of workers being attracted to the Telford.

For the less well-off inhabitants of the then new town, there needed to be council housing available. The Woodside estate was among the council housing projects first planned in the development of Telford new town. It was developed in the late 1960s and early 1970s, and was the largest housing estate planned by Telford Development Corporation. The principal idea behind the layout of the estate was to segregate motor traffic from pedestrians. Architectural historian, John Newman describes the south east part of Woodside as the "boldest experiment in housing layout in Telford". It takes the form of "exaggerated" stepped V-shaped blocks of terraced housing with windows in the gable ends.

== History ==
Woodside came to fruition due to the New Towns Act of 1946, which saw Dawley New Town, now known as Telford New Town, named after the famous Scottish civil engineer, Thomas Telford being developed to cope mainly with the overspill from the West Midlands conurbation.

The land that was chosen for Woodside was previously used for farming and mining, namely Rough Park Farm and Leasowes Farm. Brick Kiln Leasowes Crawstone Pit still part exists today in the form of its spoil mound running along both Ironbridge Road and the William Reynolds School. It was here in 1864 that a total of nine men and boys (the youngest being 12 years) fell to a tragic death, when a rope lowered to haul them out at the end of a busy day, snapped. They are buried in St Michael's Church cemetery in Madeley. Within the woodland which now covers the spoil mound is the brick pond from which water was drawn from the mine.

Situated in south Telford, Woodside was originally built as a council housing estate, managed by both Telford Development Corporation and Dawley District Council. The estate was laid out along the lines of the Radburn concept, with the frontages of the mainly terraced housing facing across unenclosed green spaces and footpaths rather than private gardens and roads. Shopping and play areas were provided as well as a health centre, two county primary schools and a playschool, public houses, a police station and a community centre. Other facilities were provided in Madeley, including Madeley Education and Recreation Centre, shops, a library and banks. Secondary education was at the Abraham Darby and Madeley Court Schools in Madeley. Roman Catholic faith schools were St Marys’ Primary, Madeley and Blessed Robert Johnson secondary at Wellington.

Employment was a main factor of people re-locating to Woodside, with plentiful employment at the newly built Tweedale and Halesfield industrial estates.

Public transport was provided by the Midland Red bus company. They offered residents local services to other areas of the new town, along with direct services to out of town places such as Shrewsbury, Bridgnorth, Wolverhampton and Birmingham.

In 1976, Telford Development Corporation allocated 81 hectares (200 acres) of former industrial land to the north and west of the estate as a public open space, named Rough Park. Part of the site was designated a local nature reserve in 2023.

== Deprivation, regeneration ==
Woodside is one of the most deprived parts of Telford. Key points from a ward profile based on the 2001 Census revealed that Woodside had the youngest age profile in the borough, the highest proportion of single-parent families with children, and the highest unemployment rate at 11.3% -though the rate was significantly down from 17.3% in 1991. A profile of Woodside based on the 2011 Census showed that all five of its output areas were in the twenty per cent nationally most deprived, with three in the ten per cent most deprived. The ward had the borough's highest proportion of claimants of housing or council tax benefit and jobseekers allowance, as well as the highest proportion of children living in poverty. The crime rate was high compared with the average for Telford and Wrekin, in particular for criminal damage and anti-social behaviour. Educational achievement was among the lowest in the borough at Key Stage 1 and Key Stage 4 and the level of home ownership was lower than the borough average.

Prince Philip, Duke of Edinburgh visited the estate in 2003 to signal the start of a major redevelopment involving demolition of The Courts deck-access flats. The Courts site lay empty for some years before Telford Council approved plans in 2009 for a 186-home development by Bellway Homes. An initial proposal for the regeneration of Woodside was to make the rear vehicular access roads like a normal street and remove the footpaths and fence in what would become the rear to make private gardens. However, this was found to be "unworkable" as the utility companies required unhindered access for repairs to the gas, water and sewage pipes laid under the footpaths. Instead, the layout of the rear service roads was made more pedestrian friendly. Almost all of the remaining houses on the estate have been brought up to modern standards.

== Sources ==
- "Woodside, Telford". English Partnerships. 18 September 2008. Archived from the original on 4 January 2009.
