= Thomas Parker (inventor) =

English electrical engineer, inventor and industrialist

- Born: 22 December 1843; Coalbrookdale, England
- Died: 5 December 1915 (aged 71); Ironbridge, England
- Occupation: Electrical engineer
- Known for: Electric car pioneer

Thomas Parker FRSE MICE (22 December 1843 – 5 December 1915) was an English electrical engineer, inventor and industrialist. He patented improvements in lead-acid batteries and dynamos, and was a pioneer of manufacturing equipment that powered electric tramways and electric lighting. He invented the smokeless fuel Coalite. He formed the first company to distribute electricity over a wide area.

He was described by Lord Kelvin as "the Edison of Europe".

== Early life ==
Parker was born at Lincoln Hill in Coalbrookdale, Shropshire, son of Thomas Wheatley Parker and Ann née Fletcher. His father was a moulder at the Coalbrookdale Ironworks. The ironworks had been founded by Abraham Darby I in the early 18th century, and Parkers had worked there for several generations. Thomas attended the local Quaker school. His first work was as a moulder, with his father.

He attended the 1862 International Exhibition in London, where he was one of four representatives of the Coalbrookdale Company. He was inspired by the technology shown there, which included the electric telegraph and the wet battery.

Later in that year he moved to Birmingham, to get more experience as a moulder; during this time he attended lectures of the nonconformist preacher George Dawson. He later moved to the Potteries, where in 1866 he married Jane Gibbons, daughter of engine-driver Lewis Gibbons. They moved to Manchester where he attended chemistry lectures of Henry Enfield Roscoe and others.

In December 1867 they moved to Coalbrookdale; Parker, initially working as a foreman, was soon offered the post of chemist in the electroplating department.

== Early inventions ==
In 1876 he and Philip Weston, a machinist at Coalbrookdale, received a patent for an improved steam pump. This was Parker's first major invention. "Parker and Weston's Patent Pump", manufactured only by the Coalbrookdale Company, was awarded a medal at the International Inventions Exhibition of 1885.

In the electroplating department, he replaced battery cells, which powered the process, with a large dynamo which he had designed and built; it was probably the first time a dynamo was used for this purpose.

Around this time there was national concern about the detrimental effect of coal smoke on cities, publicized by the Kyrle Society. The Coalbrookdale Company produced the "Kyrle Grate", invented by Parker; it was an open grate in which anthracite coal could be burnt. It was awarded a silver medal at the Smoke Abatement Exhibition in 1881.

Parker worked on improvements on the lead-acid battery invented by Gaston Planté. He took out a patent in 1882, which coincided with Gaston Planté's own patent for the same improvement; two separate patents were granted. In June 1882 Parker and Paul Bedford Elwell took out patents for improvements in dynamos and electric lighting.

== The Elwell-Parker Company ==
In October 1882, Parker and his family moved to Wolverhampton to set up in business with Paul Bedford Elwell (1853–1899). (Elwell's family had a factory there, that made nails and horseshoes.)

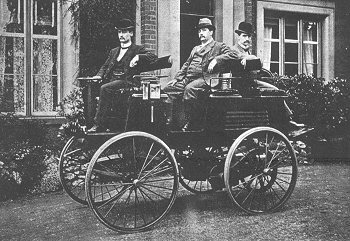
One of Parker's electric cars, outside his home in Tettenhall, near Wolverhampton. Parker is in the middle. Photo around 1895.

In Wolverhampton, Elwell and Parker began to manufacture accumulators (lead-acid batteries). From 1883 they manufactured dynamos. The business began to expand: there was soon a demand for dynamos, from the Manchester Edison Company and from Trafalgar Colliery in the Forest of Dean, for electric lighting in the mine. (This is thought to be the first time electric lighting was used underground.) Elwell-Parker dynamos supplied lighting in industrial works, and equipment was supplied for a tramway in Blackpool in 1885, the first electric tramway in the country. A prototype battery-powered tram was tested on the tramway in Birmingham. Several prototype electric cars were built. Between 1884 and 1887, further patents were taken out by Parker and Elwell for electrical equipment. In 1887 he developed a process to extract phosphorus and chlorate of soda by electrolysis.

In the general election of July 1892 Parker stood as a Liberal Party candidate for Kingswinford, where he was defeated by the Conservative candidate, the incumbent MP Alexander Staveley Hill. In 1893, he became a justice of the peace in Wolverhampton.

In 1889, the Electric Construction Corporation (E.C.C.), was founded by a syndicate to manufacture electrical equipment, and it purchased the Elwell-Parker company and others making similar equipment. A new factory was built in Bushbury, Wolverhampton. Parker failed to become a company director, but was appointed Works Manager. In 1893 an American branch of Elwell-Parker was founded in Cleveland, Ohio.

In 1893, the company was in difficulty and was reformed as the Electric Construction Company. In 1894, Parker resigned from the company and set up Thomas Parker Ltd. in Wolverhampton, making electrical equipment. (The company was eventually wound up in 1909.)

In 1892 he designed the high voltage DC system for distributing electricity in the cities of Oxford and Birmingham and in the London area at Charing Cross, Chelsea, Sydenham and Shoreditch. In 1897, he formed the Midland Electric Corporation, the first company in the world to distribute electricity over a wide area.

== In London ==
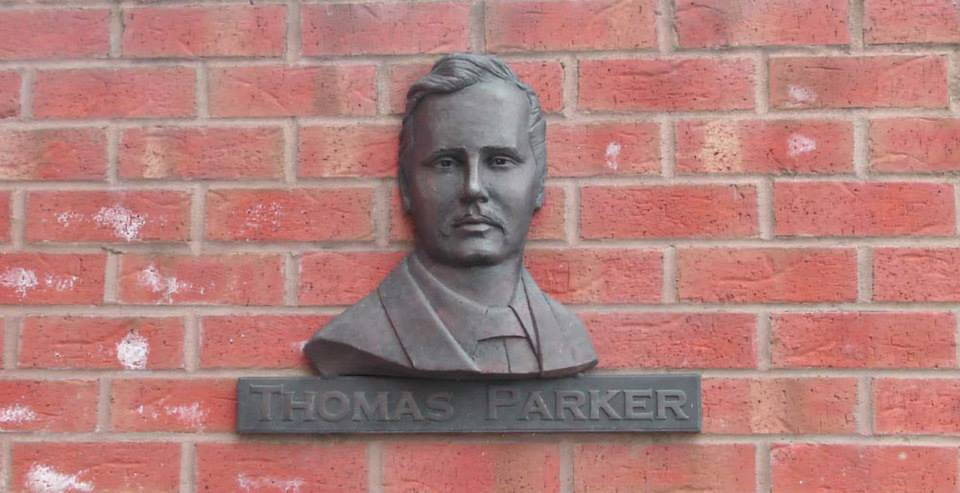
Commemorative plaque of Thomas Parker in Wolverhampton, by John McKenna (2007)

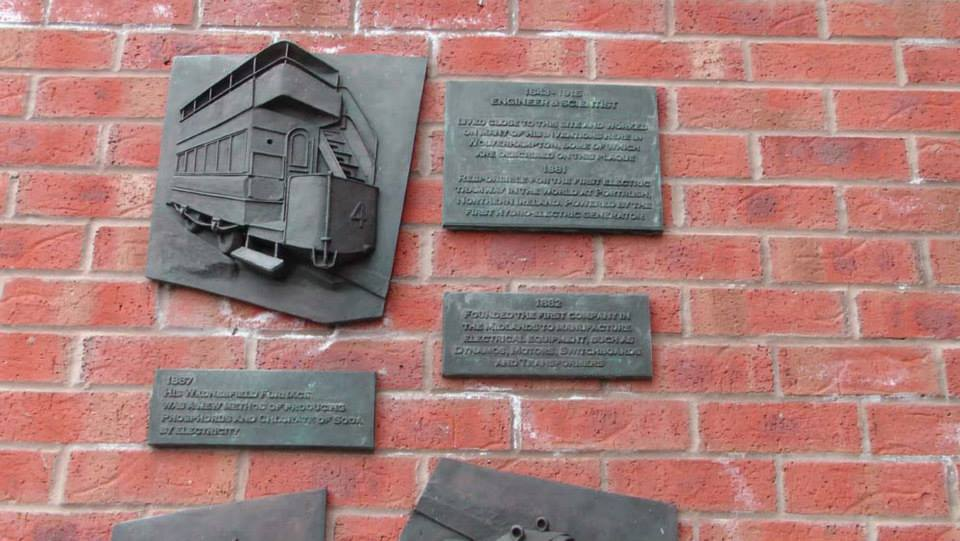
Commemorative plaques by John McKenna (2007), featuring an electric tram

In 1899 Parker resigned as managing director of Thomas Parker Ltd. He moved to London, where he was consulting engineer to the Metropolitan Railway company, involved in the electrification of the underground railway. The Neasden Power Station was opened in 1904 as part of the project. Parker stayed in London until retirement in 1908.

In 1904 he invented a new smokeless fuel, marketed as Coalite. In 1936 Parker was posthumously awarded a gold medal by the Smoke Abatement Society for this.

In 1905 he actively promoted a decimal system of his own creation, based on English weights, measures and currency.

== Retirement ==
In 1908 he retired to Ironbridge, near Coalbrookdale, where he purchased Severn House. He had a laboratory and workshop at his home, and in Coalbrookdale he gave a series of lectures on science. In 1910 he bought an ironworks on the local Madeley Court estate, and he ran this company, Court Works Ltd, with his son Charles.

He died, aged 71, of a brain tumour at home in Ironbridge in 1915, and was buried nearby at St Michael's Church, Madeley.

He had twelve children, of whom nine survived to maturity. His son Charles Henry Parker ran the company that produced Coalite; his son Thomas Hugh Parker was an inventor, building prototype motor cars.

A commemorative plaque was unveiled at the former Severn House, now a hotel (The Best Western Valley Hotel), on 10 October 2015.
