= Room square =

A Room square, named after Thomas Gerald Room, is an n-by-n array filled with n + 1 different symbols in such a way that:

1. Each cell of the array is either empty or contains an unordered pair from the set of symbols
2. Each symbol occurs exactly once in each row and column of the array
3. Every unordered pair of symbols occurs in exactly one cell of the array.

An example, a Room square of order seven, if the set of symbols is integers from 0 to 7:

0,7			1,5		4,6	2,3
3,4	1,7			2,6		0,5
1,6	4,5	2,7			0,3	
	0,2	5,6	3,7			1,4
2,5		1,3	0,6	4,7		
	3,6		2,4	0,1	5,7	
		0,4		3,5	1,2	6,7

It is known that a Room square (or squares) exist if and only if n is odd but not 3 or 5.

== Equivalences ==
A Room square of order n is equivalent to a pair of 'Orthogonal' symmetric Latin Squares of order n. Two symmetric Latin Squares cannot be orthogonal with respect to the definition of containing every ordered pair of symbols, however the join of the squares will contain every unordered pair exactly once above the diagonal.

The 'Row' Latin Square uses a row labeling of the Room square as symbols, e.g. $\{ r_0, r_1,\dots, r_{n-1} \}$, and labels the cell $(i,j)$ (and $(j,i)$) with $r_a$ if the unordered pair $\{i,j\}$ appears in the Room square in row $a$. Further, the Room square's additional symbol, sometimes denoted $\infty$, is removed and the corresponding cells in the Latin square are filled with the remaining symbol of the pair. The 'Column' Latin square is constructed similarly.

For example, the row and column Latin squares of the above Room square of order 7:

0	4	1	5	2	6	3
4	1	5	2	6	3	0
1	5	2	6	3	0	4
5	2	6	3	0	4	1
2	6	3	0	4	1	5
6	3	0	4	1	5	2
3	0	4	1	5	2	6

0	5	3	2	6	1	4
5	1	6	4	3	0	2
3	6	1	0	5	4	1
2	4	0	2	1	6	5
6	3	5	1	2	2	0
1	0	4	6	2	6	3
4	2	1	5	0	3	0

A Room square is equivalent to a pair of Orthogonal 1-factorizations of $K_{r+1}$, the complete graph on $r+1$ vertices. Reading the rows of the Room square as the edges of a 1-factor gives one 1-factorisation. The orthogonal pair comes from the column 1-factors.

== History ==
The order-7 Room square was used by Robert Richard Anstice to provide additional solutions to Kirkman's schoolgirl problem in the mid-19th century, and Anstice also constructed an infinite family of Room squares, but his constructions did not attract attention. Thomas Gerald Room reinvented Room squares in a note published in 1955, and they came to be named after him. In his original paper on the subject, Room observed that n must be odd and unequal to 3 or 5, but it was not shown that these conditions are both necessary and sufficient until the work of W. D. Wallis in 1973.

== Applications ==
Pre-dating Room's paper, Room squares had been used by the directors of duplicate bridge tournaments in the construction of the tournaments. In this application they are known as Howell rotations. The columns of the square represent tables, each of which holds a deal of the cards that is played by each pair of teams that meet at that table. The rows of the square represent rounds of the tournament, and the numbers within the cells of the square represent the teams that are scheduled to play each other at the table and round represented by that cell.

Archbold and Johnson used Room squares to construct experimental designs.

There are connections between Room squares and other mathematical objects including quasigroups, Latin squares, graph factorizations, and Steiner triple systems.

== See also ==
- Combinatorial design
- Magic square
- Square matrices
