= St Mary's Church, Madeley =

St Mary's Church
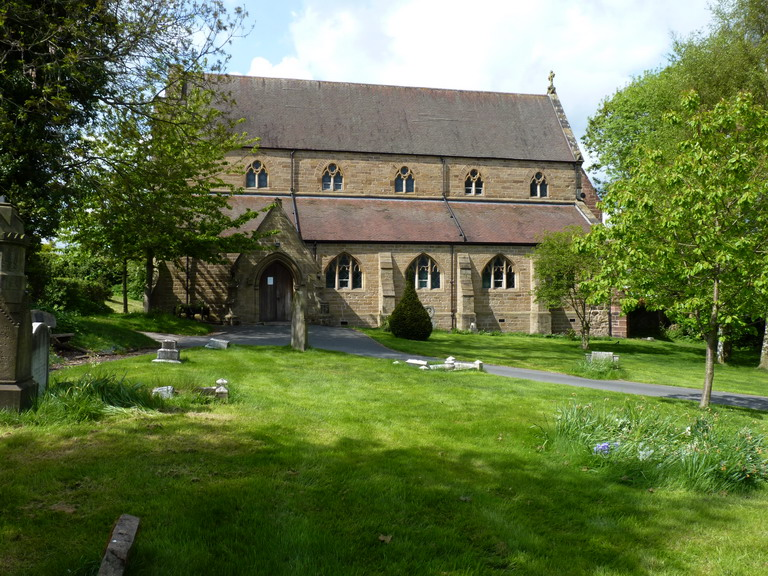
- St Mary's Church
- 52.637°N 2.447°W
- OS grid reference: SJ 69789 04460
- Location: Madeley, Telford
- Country: England
- Denomination: Catholic Church
- Website: GoodShepherd.org.uk

History
- Status: Active
- Founded: 1769
- Dedication: Blessed Virgin Mary

Architecture
- Functional status: Parish church
- Architect: Joseph Hansom
- Style: Gothic Revival
- Groundbreaking: 21 April 1852
- Completed: 18 August 1853

Specifications
- Capacity: 500

Administration
- Province: Birmingham
- Diocese: Shrewsbury
- Deanery: Shropshire & Wrekin
- Parish: Good Shepherd

St Mary's Church is a Roman Catholic church located on the corner of the High Street and Hanover Close in Madeley, Shropshire, England. It was built from 1852 to 1853 and was designed by Joseph Hansom in the Gothic Revival style. English Reformation

From 1769, the congregation went to the presbytery next to the church, where Catholic Mass was celebrated in secret in a chapel. According to Historic England, it "is a very rare survivor of a house," and a Grade II listed building.

== History ==
=== Massing House ===
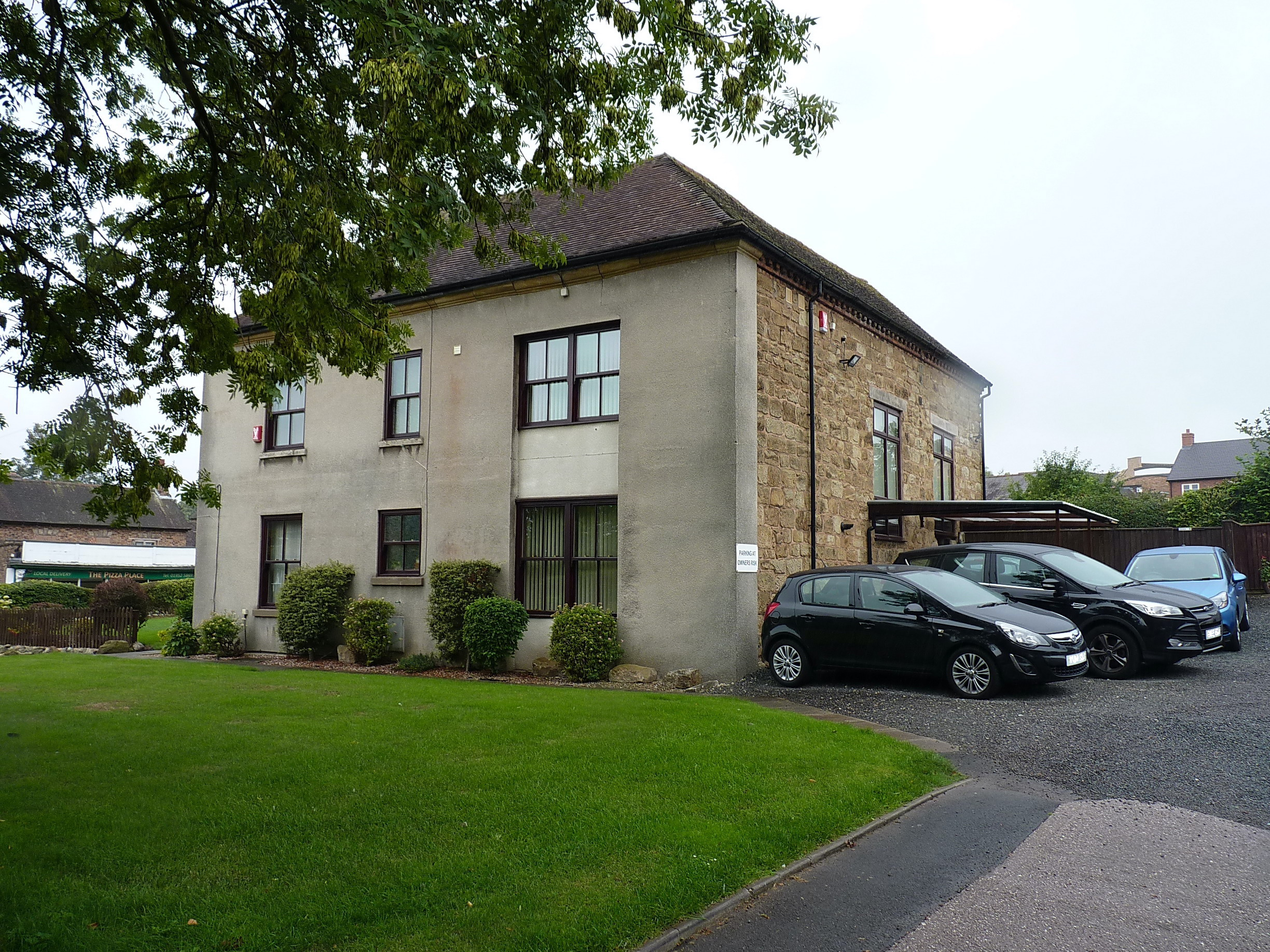
Presbytery and Massing House

After the Reformation, Madeley continued having a local Catholic community. In 1676, it was recorded that there were 51 adult "papists" living in Madeley. This was the highest number of Catholics in Shropshire. The Catholic community was supported by the Brooke family, the descendents of Robert Broke. There was a secret school and a chapel at the Brooke home, Madeley Court.

Madeley became a Catholic centre from which other Catholic missions were started in the surrounding area, and became known as "the Mother mission of Shropshire". In 1760, the Giffard family donated the current site of the church. They were descendants of John Giffard, and relatives of the Giffards who were behind the construction of St Peter and St Paul's Church, Wolverhampton.

In 1769, the current house was built on the site, which had a chapel at the back. The house chapel was used to celebrate Mass and became known as the Massing House. The house chapel cost £500 to build and some of the cost was paid for by the Duke of Norfolk.

=== St Mary's Church ===
In 1849, Fr W. Molloy began serving the mission. The chapel initially had a capacity of 200 people. However, by 1851, attendance for Sunday Mass was closer to 500, so a larger church needed to be built. On 21 April 1852, the foundation stone was laid. The church was designed by Joseph Hansom and was situated behind the house. On 18 August 1853, the church was opened.

In September 1882, Missionaries of the Sacred Heart moved into the house and served the church. In 1889, while the church was served by the priest at St Mary's Church in Shifnal, the house became a girls' boarding school. In 1969, the house again became a presbytery and later used by the parish.

== Parish ==
St Mary's Church is part of the parish of the Good Shepherd in the Roman Catholic Diocese of Shrewsbury, along with St Paul's Church in Dawley. St Mary's Church has two Sunday Masses at 5:00pm on Saturday (vigil) and at 11:00am on Sunday. St Paul's Church has one Sunday Mass at 9:00am.

== See also ==
- Listed buildings in Madeley, Shropshire
