= Thomas Gerald Room =

Australian mathematician

FRS FAA Thomas Gerald Room
- Born: 2 November 1902
- Died: 2 April 1986 (aged 83)
- Education: St John's College, Cambridge
- Scientific career
- Fields: Mathematics
- Workplaces: University of Sydney

Thomas Gerald Room FRS FAA (10 November 1902 – 2 April 1986) was an Australian mathematician who is best known for Room squares. He was a Foundation Fellow of the Australian Academy of Science. Room was born in London and educated at St John's College, Cambridge he moved to Sydney, Australia, in 1935. During the Second World War he worked for the Australian government to decrypt coded Japanese communications. After the war Room became dean of the faculty of science at the University of Sydney and later worked in the US and England.

== Biography ==
Thomas Room was born on 10 November 1902, near London, England. He studied mathematics in St John's College, Cambridge, and was a wrangler in 1923. He continued at Cambridge as a graduate student, and was elected as a fellow in 1925, but instead took a position at the University of Liverpool. He returned to Cambridge in 1927, at which time he completed his PhD, with a thesis supervised by H. F. Baker. Room remained at Cambridge until 1935, when he moved to the University of Sydney, where he accepted the position of Chair of the Mathematics Department, a position he held until his retirement in 1968.

During World War II he worked for the Australian government, helping to decrypt Japanese communications. In January 1940, with the encouragement of the Australian Army, he, together with some colleagues at the University of Sydney, began to study Japanese codes. The others were the mathematician Richard Lyons and the classicists Arthur Dale Trendall and Athanasius Treweek. By this time Room had already begun learning Japanese under Margaret Ethel Lake (1883-?) at the University of Sydney. In May 1941 Room and Treweek attended a meeting at the Victoria Barracks in Melbourne with the Director of Naval Intelligence of the Royal Australian Navy, several Australian Army intelligence officers and Eric Nave, an expert Japanese cryptographer with the Royal Australian Navy. As a result, it was agreed that Room's group, with the agreement of the University of Sydney, would move in August 1941 to work under Nave at the Special Intelligence Bureau in Melbourne. On 1 September 1941, Room was sent to the Far East Combined Bureau in Singapore to study the codebreaking techniques used there. After the outbreak of war they were working for FRUMEL (Fleet Radio Unit Melbourne), a joint American-Australian intelligence unit, but when Lieutenant Rudolph Fabian took over command of FRUMEL and particularly when, in October 1942, FRUMEL was placed under direct control of the US Navy, civilians such as the member of Room's group were found surplus to requirements and returned to their academic posts.

After the war, Room served as dean of the faculty of science at the University of Sydney from 1952 to 1956 and again from 1960 to 1965. He also held visiting positions at the University of Washington in 1948, and the Institute for Advanced Study and Princeton University in 1957. He retired from Sydney in 1968 but took short-term positions afterwards at Westfield College in London and the Open University before returning to Australia in 1974. He died on 2 April 1986.

Room married Jessica Bannerman, whom he met in Sydney, in 1937; they had one son and two daughters.

== Research ==
Room's PhD work concerned generalizations of the Schläfli double six, a configuration formed by the 27 lines on a cubic algebraic surface.

In 1938 he published the book The geometry of determinantal loci through the Cambridge University Press. Nearly 500 pages long, the book combines methods of synthetic geometry and algebraic geometry to study higher-dimensional generalizations of quartic surfaces and cubic surfaces. It describes many infinite families of algebraic varieties, and individual varieties in these families, following a unifying principle that nearly all loci arising in algebraic geometry can be expressed as the solution to an equation involving the determinant of an appropriate matrix.

In the postwar period, Room shifted the focus of his work to Clifford algebra and spinor groups. Later, in the 1960s, he also began investigating finite geometry, and wrote a textbook on the foundations of geometry.

Room invented Room squares in a brief note published in 1955. A Room square is an n × n grid in which some of the cells are filled by sets of two of the numbers from 0 to n in such a way that each number appears once in each row or column and each two-element set occupies exactly one cell of the grid. Although Room squares had previously been studied by Robert Richard Anstice, Anstice's work had become forgotten and Room squares were named after Room. In his initial work on the subject, Room showed that, for a Room square to exist, n must be odd and cannot equal 3 or 5. It was later shown by W. D. Wallis in 1973 that these are necessary and sufficient conditions: every other odd value of n has an associated Room square. The nonexistence of a Room square for n = 5 and its existence for n = 7 can both be explained in terms of configurations in projective geometry.

Despite retiring in 1968, Room remained active mathematically for several more years, and published the book Miniquaternion geometry: An introduction to the study of projective planes in 1971 with his student Philip B. Kirkpatrick.

== Awards and honours ==
In 1941, Room won the Thomas Ranken Lyle Medal of the Australian National Research Council and was elected as a Fellow of the Royal Society. He was one of the Foundation Fellows of the Australian Academy of Science, chartered in 1954. From 1960 to 1962, he served as president of the Australian Mathematical Society and he later became the first editor of its journal.

The T. G. Room award of the Mathematical Association of New South Wales, awarded to the student with the best score in the NSW Higher School Certificate Mathematics Extension 2 examination, is named in Room's honour.
