= John Bromley (translator) =

John Bromley, English churchman and translator, died 1717

John Bromley (died 10 January 1717) was an English clergyman, Catholic convert, and translator.

== Life ==
Bromley was a native of Shropshire. He was educated at Shrewsbury School and Magdalene College, Cambridge, according to Venn, although his biographer Thompson Cooper, in the Dictionary of National Biography tentatively identified him with a John Bromley who was a student at Christ Church, Oxford who graduated B.A. in 1685 and M.A. in 1688.

At the beginning of James II's reign he was curate of St. Giles's-in-the-Fields, London, but soon afterwards he joined the Roman Catholic Church and obtained employment as a corrector of the press in the king's printing-house. On being deprived of this means of subsistence, he established a boarding-school in London which was attended by the sons of many persons of rank. Charles Dodd claimed he taught Alexander Pope. Later Bromley was appointed tutor to some young gentlemen, and travelled with them abroad.

His death occurred at Madeley, Shropshire on 10 January 1717.

== Works ==
According to Dodd, he published The Catechism for the Curats, composed by the Decree of the Council of Trent, faithfully translated into English (London 1687). He was probably also the translator of The Canons and Decrees of the Council of Trent (London 1687).
