= Listed buildings in Madeley, Shropshire =

Madeley is a town and a civil parish in the district of Telford and Wrekin, Shropshire, England. It contains 54 listed buildings that are recorded in the National Heritage List for England. Of these, one is listed at Grade I, the highest of the three grades, seven are at Grade II*, the middle grade, and the others are at Grade II, the lowest grade. Most of the listed buildings are grouped in or near the town centre, and these include houses and cottages, the earliest being timber framed, two larger houses with associated structures, churches, a presbytery, a school, and a war memorial. To the north of the town centre is Madeley Court, now a hotel, which is listed together with associated structures. Outside the town centre are more listed houses, two public houses, and former industrial structures, including an inclined plane, a bridge, and the remains of a brickworks and an ironworks, the latter two forming part of the museum at Blists Hill Victorian Town.

== Key ==
Grade	Criteria
I	Buildings of exceptional interest, sometimes considered to be internationally important
II*	Particularly important buildings of more than special interest
II	Buildings of national importance and special interest

== Buildings ==
Name and location	Photograph	Date	Notes	Grade
The Little Haye; 52.63602°N 2.44938°W		Medieval	A row of houses at right angles to the street, they were extended in the 17th and 18th centuries. The original part is timber framed with cruck construction, and the 18th-century extensions at the ends are in brick. The earliest part is in the centre and has brick infill, one storey and an attic, a jettied gable, and a large dormer. The timber-framed extension to the right has plaster infill, two storeys, a jettied gable, and an 18th-century two-storey canted bay window with sashes and a modillion cornice. The extension facing the street has a bow window with an entablature, and a shop front with pilasters. Inside the original part are cruck trusses.	II
Madeley Court; 52.64328°N 2.45150°W		16th century	The building contains some 13th-century material. Originally a grange to Wenlock Priory, later a private house, it has been much altered and extended, and was restored and converted into a hotel in the late 20th century. It is in stone with tile roofs, and has two storeys and attics, and an irregular L-shaped plan. The windows are mullioned and transomed, and the gables are coped and parapeted and have finials. The 17th-century porch has a moulded round arch, and gables with volutes, pediments and strapwork foliage decoration.	II*
Gatehouse, Madeley Court; 52.64289°N 2.45170°W		Late 16th or early 17th century	The gatehouse is in ashlar stone with tile roofs, and consists of two turrets flanking an archway. The turrets are octagonal with two storeys and an attic, and have an entablature over the ground floor, moulded string courses and cornices, and pyramidal roofs. They contain cross-windows and medallions. The archway is round-headed and now blocked, and above it is a mullioned window and a shaped gable.	I
61 and 62 and 63–65 High Street; 52.63719°N 2.44609°W		Early 17th century (probable)	The oldest buildings are Nos. 61 and 62, which are timber framed with plaster infill on a sandstone and brick plinth. They have one storey and an attic, and two bays, the right bay gabled. The windows are mullioned, and there is a gabled dormer in the left bay. At the rear is an 18th-century rear wing in brick and sandstone. Nos. 63–65 were added in the early to mid-19th century. They are in brick, and have two storeys and two bays facing the road. In the ground floor is a shop front with pilasters and an entablature, and a doorway with a rectangular fanlight. Above are sash windows, and the roofs are tiled.	II
Former water mill, Madeley Court; 52.64251°N 2.45137°W	—	Early 17th century (probable)	The water mill, later converted and used for other purposes, is in red brick with stone dressings and quoins. There are two storeys and three bays, with three gables at the rear. The windows are mullioned.	II*
Upper House; 52.63453°N 2.45210°W		Early 17th century	The house has been much altered. It is mainly roughcast with some exposed timber framing, and has a stuccoed 18th-century wing, and a tile roof. There are two storeys and an attic, a front of five bays, and two rear wings, forming a U-shaped plan. Some of the windows are mullioned and transomed, there are Venetian windows at the rear and in the east front, some windows are in Gothic style, and other windows are modern. The doorway has panelled pilaster and an entablature with a pediment.	II
36 and 37 Station Road; 52.63623°N 2.44572°W	—	17th century	A pair of timber framed cottages with tile roofs. No. 36 was refronted in brick in the 19th century, and No. 37 is stuccoed. They have one storey and an attic and three bays. The windows are casements, and there are two gabled dormers. At the rear of No. 36 is a brick wing.	II
Sundial, Madeley Court; 52.64324°N 2.45222°W	—	17th century	The astronomical sundial is in the grounds of the hotel. It is stone and consists of a cuboid block about 4 feet (1.2 m) square, on squat moulded columns on a base. The block has a domed top and hemispherical recessed sides with various shaped recesses for dials.	II*
Barn, The Old Hall; 52.63524°N 2.45327°W		17th century	The barn is timber framed with red brick infill, partly refaced in red brick, on a stone plinth, and it has a tile roof with gabled ends. The windows are modern. On the east side is a projecting 19th-century horse engine house with an open semicircular front and wooden posts on a stone plinth.	II
Stables and mounting block, The Old Hall; 52.63506°N 2.45319°W		17th century	The stable range is timber framed with red brick infill on an ashlar base. It a tile roof, and an L-shaped plan. The west side has been faced with sandstone, and the south side in red brick. In the angle is a mounting block in rusticated ashlar.	II
Garden Walls to the north and northwest of Madeley Court; 52.64350°N 2.45262°W	—	Late 17th century	The walls form three sides of a rectangular enclosure to the northwest and west of the house. They are in red brick, and at the northeast corner is a stone doorway that has a moulded architrave and a semicircular dentilled pediment.	II*
The Old Hall; 52.63501°N 2.45280°W		c. 1700	A red brick house with a storey band, a modillion eaves cornice, and a hipped tile roof. There are two storeys and an attic, and five bays. The central doorway has a moulded surround and a fanlight, and above it is a shell hood carried on brackets and on the scrolled keystone of the doorway. The windows are sashes with keystones, and there are three dormers with hipped roofs.	II*
Gate piers, The Old Vicarage; 52.63420°N 2.45015°W		c. 1700	The gate piers are in stone and are rusticated. They have moulded bases and caps, and ball finials. The wrought iron gates are modern.	II
7 Church Street; 52.63445°N 2.45174°W		17th or 18th century	A cottage in ashlar stone that has a tile roof, and brick gables that were added later. There are two storeys, and most of the windows are casements. On the side facing the road is a large exposed chimney breast with offsets.	II
Hay House Farmhouse; 52.62336°N 2.44949°W	—	17th or 18th century	A brick house, mainly roughcast, with a hipped tile roof, two storeys, and five bays, the outer bays projecting. The windows are sashes with voussoired heads and keystones. There is a central doorway and a conservatory, and on the side is a wooden trellis porch and another doorway. The chimney stacks are massive and have blind round-headed arcading.	II
Garden walls to the southeast of Madeley Court; 52.64282°N 2.45084°W	—	17th or 18th century	The walls form three sides of a rectangular enclosure to the southeast of the house. They are in stone and brick, and have saddleback coping.	II
The Old Vicarage; 52.63416°N 2.44993°W		c. 1717	A red brick house with rusticated quoins, string courses, a moulded cornice, a parapet, and a hipped tile roof. There are three storeys, and a square plan with a front of four bays and three bays on the sides. The central doorway has a moulded keystone and a shell hood on carved brackets. The windows are sashes with keystones, but most are blind.	II*
8 Church Street; 52.63436°N 2.45157°W	—	Early 18th century	A red brick house with a modillion eaves cornice, and a tile roof with parapet gable ends. There are two storeys and an attic, and five bays. In the centre is a protruding porch flanked by square bay windows, all with hipped roofs. The upper floor contains sash windows with fluted keyblocks, and there are three gabled dormers.	II
Hall Cottages; 52.63534°N 2.45289°W		18th century	A row of houses in red brick with a string course, a moulded eaves cornice, and a tile roof, hipped at one end and gabled at the other. They have two storeys and an attic, five bays, and a gabled rear wing, giving an L-shaped plan. There are two doorways with fanlights, the windows are casements, those in the ground floor with segmental heads, and above are three gabled dormers.	II
Coach house and stables, The Old Hall; 52.63547°N 2.45299°W		18th century	The former coach house and stables have a sandstone ground floor, a brick upper floor, quoins, a dentil eaves course, and a tile roof. There are four bays, and a single-storey north wing. In the ground floor are four segmental-headed doorways, and in the upper floor are inserted windows in blind segmental arches, and ventilation holes in a diamond patterns.	II
Gazebo, The Old Hall; 52.63485°N 2.45264°W		18th century	The gazebo is in the garden of the hall, and is in red brick with a pyramidal tile roof. It has a square plan, two storeys, and sides of one bay. The ground floor is open and has an arched entrance, in the upper floor are sash windows, and there are external steps to the upper floor.	II
The Royal Oak; 52.63725°N 2.44540°W		18th century	A red brick house that has a tile roof with gables and stone coped eaves. There are two storeys and an attic, and three bays. Steps lead up to the central doorway, the windows are casements with voussoirs and keystones, and there are two flat-roofed dormers containing sash windows.	II
Coach house and barn, Upper House; 52.63472°N 2.45247°W		18th century	The barn is timber framed with red brick infill on a sandstone plinth, and has a tile roof with gabled ends. It forms a long range facing the road, and has three gables, each containing a window with a pointed arch and a lattice grill. At the east end is an 18th-century coach house at right angles. This is in brick, and has an arcaded east front with keystones and a dated tablet.	II
Garden wall, Upper House; 52.63478°N 2.45209°W	—	18th century	The wall enclosing the garden to the northeast of the house is in sandstone, and has chamfered coping.	II
66 and 67 High Street; 52.63718°N 2.44632°W	—	18th century	A shop to which a warehouse and cottages were added at the rear in the mid-19th century. The front range is in stuccoed brick with modillion eaves and a tile roof. There are three storeys and three bays. In the ground floor are shop fronts over which is an entablature, and in the upper floors are sash windows with voussoirs and keyblocks.	II
St Mary's Presbytery; 52.63705°N 2.44786°W	—	1769	The presbytery and former chapel at the rear are in sandstone and brick and have tile roofs. The presbytery is partly rendered and has a moulded eaves cornice, two storeys and three bays. The windows and door are modern, and there is a modern single-storey stone lean-to on the left. The former chapel, later a parish room, has a dentil eaves cornice, and there are large rectangular windows with concrete lintels.	II
Golf Club Shop and Changing Rooms; 52.62395°N 2.44933°W	—	1775	The building was originally a stable range with a hay loft above. It is in red brick and has a tile roof with parapeted gable ends. In the ground floor are doorways and windows with segmental heads, the upper floor contains modern windows, and above these are ventilation holes in triangular and diamond patterns. In the gable end is a dated circular plaque.	II
Rough Park Riding School; 52.64063°N 2.46795°W	—	Late 18th century	A brick house with dentil eaves, and a tile roof with stone coped gable ends. There are three storeys, three bays, and a two-storey gabled rear wing. The central doorway has engaged Doric columns and a pediment, and above it is a large plaque. The windows are sashes in segmental headed openings.	II
The Beacon Public House; 52.63284°N 2.47179°W		Late 18th century	The public house is stuccoed with quoin pilasters, and has a coped parapet and a hipped tile roof. There are three storeys, three bays, and flanking single-storey projecting wings. In the centre is a projecting porch with pilasters and a pediment, and the windows are sashes with voussoired lintels and keyblocks.	II
Garden wall east of The Old Hall; 52.63497°N 2.45195°W	—	Late 18th century (probable)	The wall encloses the garden on three sides to the east of the hall. It is in red brick with stone coping, and is ramped up to the southeast corner.	II
All Nations Inn; 52.62993°N 2.45281°W		1789	The public house is in brick with a dentil eaves course and a gabled tile roof. There are two storeys and an attic, and three bays. On the front is a gabled porch. Most of the windows are casements, and above the porch is a sash window; all the windows have keyblocks.	II
St Michael's Church; 52.63373°N 2.45024°W		1794–97	The church was designed by Thomas Telford in Neoclassical style, and the square chancel was added in 1909–10. The church is in stone, and has a hipped slate roof, an octagonal plan, and a square tower at the north end and the chancel at the south. It has an entablature and two tiers of iron-framed windows with a string course between; the windows in the upper tier have round heads and in the lower tier they are flat-headed. The tower has four stages: the bottom stage is rusticated, the next stage is pedimented, there is a clock face in the third stage, and the top stage contains round-headed bell openings, and has a parapet with ball finials on the corners. At the end of the chancel is a Venetian window, and on the sides are niches containing kneeling figures.	II*
Churchyard wall, St Michael's Church; 52.63410°N 2.45054°W	—	1796	The wall encloses the churchyard to the north of the church. It is in ashlar stone, and at each end are pairs of octagonal gate piers.	II
2–5 Station Road; 52.63425°N 2.44908°W	—	Late 18th to early 19th century	A terrace of four stuccoed brick houses with dentil eaves and a hipped tile roof. There are three storeys and each house has one bay. The doorways have rectangular fanlights, and the windows are sashes with voussoirs. In front of the front garden area is a low brick wall with stone coping and railings.	II
34 and 35 Station Road; 52.63612°N 2.44573°W	—	Late 18th to early 19th century	A stuccoed brick house with moulded eaves and a tile roof. There are two storeys and two bays. In the ground floor on the right is a shop front with a central doorway, pilasters, and an entablature. The windows are sashes with voussoirs.	II
Garden wall southwest of The Old Hall; 52.63482°N 2.45303°W	—	18th or 19th century	The wall encloses the garden to the southwest of the hall, and follows the curve of the road. It is a high wall in sandstone and has chamfered coping.	II
9 High Street; 52.63649°N 2.44904°W	—	Early 19th century	A house at right angles to the road, later used for other purposes, it is in buff brick with a string course, a cornice and blocking course, and a hipped tile roof. There are two storeys and three bays, the centre bay recessed and the outer bays bowed. The central doorway has Tuscan columns and an entablature, and the windows are sashes with panelled lintels. On the front facing the road is a large shop front that has a modillion cornice and an entablature, a frieze containing wreaths, and decorative console brackets with lions above.	II
Remains of Blists Hill Ironworks; 52.62715°N 2.45292°W		Early 19th century	The remains consist of three brick furnace arches set into a hillside with stone retaining walls, and stone foundations in front. At each end is a brick engine house. The north engine house has round-headed windows and a hipped roof, and the engine room at the south has a gabled roof. The remains of the furnaces are also a Scheduled Monument.	II
Infant School; 52.63540°N 2.44959°W		c. 1833	Originally a Wesleyan chapel, and later a school, it is in brick with corner pilasters and a slate roof, and is in Classical style. The front has three bays and a moulded pediment containing a circular opening. In the centre is a projecting pedimented porch with a stone plaque, and the windows have round arches.	II
39 and 40 Church Street; 52.63575°N 2.44980°W		Early to mid 19th century	A pair of brick houses with dentil eaves, and a tile roof with gabled ends. They have three storeys and three bays each. The doorways have pilasters and entablatures, and the windows are sashes with voussoired arches and keyblocks. No. 39 also has a bay window.	II
11 High Street; 52.63657°N 2.44838°W	—	Early to mid 19th century	A brick house with a tile roof, two storeys and three bays. There is a shop front with pilasters, an entablature, and a central projecting pedimented porch filled with an arcade of three windows. The other windows are sashes with voussoired lintels and keyblocks. To the right is an elliptical-arched entrance.	II
28 Park Street; 52.63561°N 2.45667°W	—	Early to mid 19th century	A buff brick house with dentil eaves and a hipped tile roof. There are two storeys and three bays. The central doorway has a semicircular traceried fanlight and an open pediment. The windows are sashes with segmental lintels and keystones.	II
The Hollies; 52.63677°N 2.46573°W	—	Early to mid 19th century	A brick house with a hipped tile roof, two storeys and a symmetrical front of three bays. The central doorway has pilasters and a flat hood on consoles. The windows are sashes that have segmental-headed cast iron lintels with keyblocks.	II
The Villa; 52.63704°N 2.45216°W	—	Early to mid 19th century	A red brick house that has a parapet with moulded stone coping and a hipped tile roof. In the centre is a porch with pilasters, Tuscan columns, and a heavy entablature. The windows are sashes with segmental-arched lintels and keyblocks.	II
Yew Tree House; 52.63658°N 2.46327°W	—	Early to mid 19th century	A brick house with a hipped tile roof, two storeys and three bays. The doorway has pilasters and a pediment, and there is another pedimented doorway at the rear. The windows are sashes with cast iron segmental-headed lintels and keyblocks.	II
Fletcher Methodist Church; 52.63699°N 2.44991°W		1841	The chapel is in Classical style, and is in yellow brick with stone dressings and a slate roof. The entrance front has three bays, each flanked by Tuscan pilasters. These carry a stuccoed architrave and a triangular pediment containing an inscribed plaque and circular opening. In the outer bays are doorways with pilasters and pediments, and the windows are round-headed in arched recesses. Along the sides are five bays.	II
Former National School; 52.63433°N 2.45037°W		1841	The former school is in brick with stone dressings, a string course, and a moulded modillion cornice and is in Tudor style. It has a tile roof with stone coping and kneelers. There are two storeys, and a symmetrical front of three bays, the middle bay projecting and gabled, with a plaque and a datestone in the gable. The central doorway has a four-centred arched head and a hood mould, and the windows are mullioned with chamfered surrounds and hood moulds.	II
8 Station Road; 52.63463°N 2.44867°W	—	Mid 19th century	A brick house that has a tile roof with gabled ends, two storeys and three bays. The windows are sashes with moulded segmental-arched lintels and keyblocks. The doorway is at the rear.	II
Baggaleys Wind; 52.63031°N 2.45315°W	—	19th century	A disused inclined plane, originally worked by a winding engine, connecting the Meadows Pit Colliery with the Blists Hill Ironworks site via the Lee Dingle Bridge. It is paved with brick and is overgrown.	II
Railings and gate, St Michael's Church; 52.63396°N 2.45064°W	—	Mid 19th century (probable)	The railings and gate are in the churchyard in front of the vicarage. The railings are in iron, and on a low brick wall. The gate and gate piers are in wrought iron, the gate is ornate, and the openwork gate piers have finials.	II
Anstice Memorial Institute; 52.63646°N 2.45033°W		1868	A red brick building in Italianate style, with stone dressings, an entablature with a heavy cornice, and a hipped tile roof. There are two storeys and seven bays, with pilasters flanking the outer bays. In the centre is a projecting porch with a heavy entablature on square piers. The windows in the ground floor have flat heads. and in the upper floor they are in pilastered recesses with round heads, with panels below.	II
Remains of Blists Hill Brickworks; 52.62814°N 2.45152°W		c. 1870	The remains are in brick with tile roofs, and include two tall square chimneys, three kilns, two drying sheds, a clay-preparation block, a canal wharf, a workshop and an office. On the other side of the canal are a steam winding engine shed and mine headgear.	II
Lee Dingle Bridge; 52.62934°N 2.45291°W		1872	The bridge was built to link the Meadows Pit Colliery with the Blists Hill Ironworks site via Baggaleys Wind. It is a lattice girder bridge carried on two piers in blue engineering brick. The abutments at each end have cast iron parapets.	II
War memorial 52.63679°N 2.45111°W		11920	The war memorial stands in Russell Square, and is in Portland stone. It consists of an obelisk on a two-staged square chamfered plinth on a single-stepped base. On the front of the obelisk is a carved sword, a wreath, and a recessed inscribed panel. The names of those lost in the two World Wars are inscribed on marble tablets on the four sides of the plinth.	II
