= Wyke Bayliss =

British painter, author and poet (1835–1906)

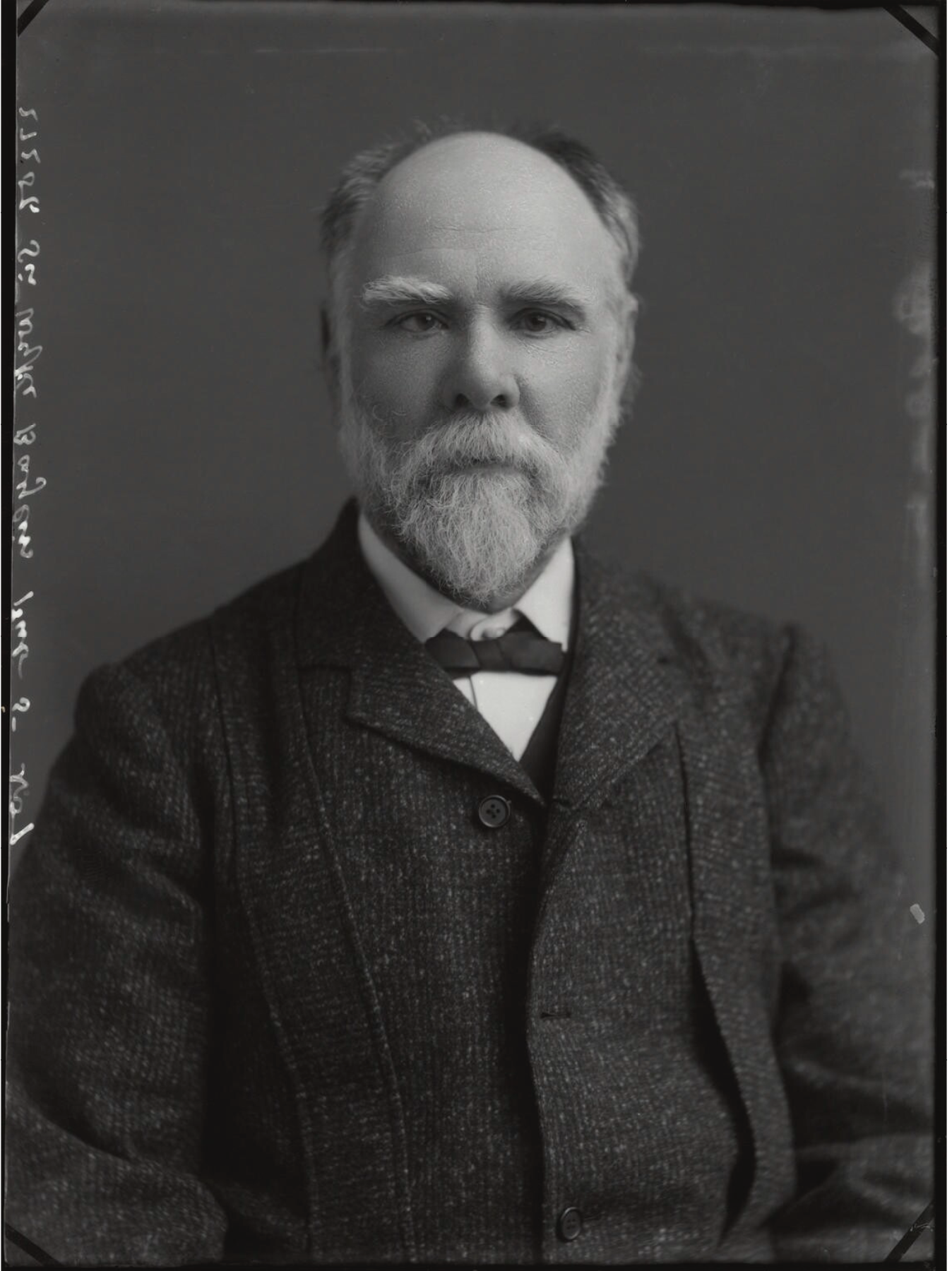
- Bayliss in 1897
- Born: 21 October 1835; Madeley, Shropshire, England
- Died: 5 April 1906 (aged 70)
- Occupations: Painter, author and poet
- Notable work: The Enchanted Island,

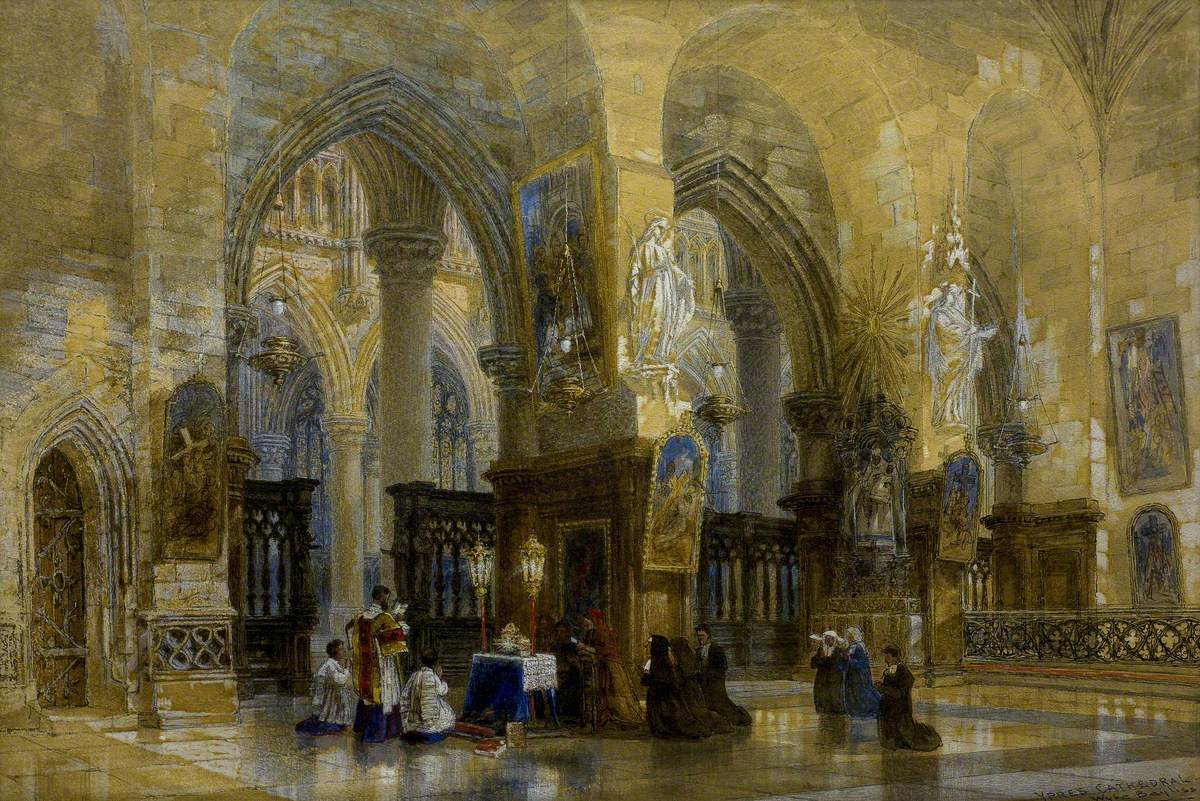
Ypres Cathedral, 1868

Sir Wyke Bayliss FSA RBA (21 October 1835 – 5 April 1906) was a British painter, author, and poet. He almost exclusively painted interiors of British and European churches and cathedrals, and was known in the late Victorian era as an academic authority on art. From the start of his career Bayliss' main interest was in depicting architecture, finding "infinite charm" in the "infinite variety of the aspect of a Cathedral interior".

Bayliss succeeded James McNeill Whistler as president of the Royal Society of British Artists (RBA) in June 1888 when Whistler and his followers split from the society, holding the post until his death.

== Life ==
Bayliss was born in Madeley, Shropshire. His unusual first name was his mother Anne's maiden surname. His brother William Wyke Bayliss became a vicar and sister Elizabeth Anne Bayliss married a vicar, whilst a second sister Mary died as a teenager. Bayliss' wider family consisted of a number of luminaries. His great uncle was Thomas Turner, founder of the Caughley porcelain factory, a major leader in the development of the Willow pattern. Bayliss owned a portrait of Turner by Sir Joshua Reynolds as well as a number of further family portraits by Lemuel Francis Abbott. His second cousin was Sir William Maddock Bayliss.

His father, Rev. John Cox Bayliss was a former railway engineer who taught military and mathematical drawing, and was also an artist known for his work Views of Shropshire published in 1839. He gave his younger son training after he showed drawing aptitude at an early age. His childhood is recorded in his father's diary, transcribed and published as "Wheels of Providence".

The family moved from Madeley to London following a job offer too good to refuse, giving Bayliss the opportunity to immerse himself in the emerging art scene of the early Victorian period. As a young student at the Royal Academy and the School of Design he became affiliated with the Pre-Raphaelites, and he counted amongst his friends John Millais, Frederic Leighton, William Holman Hunt and Edward Burne-Jones While distant from the Pre-Raphaelites in subject and technique, his paintings often reflect the juxtaposition of detail and colour that characterise much of Millais' and Leighton's work. Frederick Wedmore states in the foreword to Bayliss' autobiography "On reflection it will be seen that Wyke Bayliss had his speciality pretty well to himself. He was the inventor of his own genre – as well as his own method". Bayliss' paintings are held in many smaller UK and European collections, including the Atkinson Art Gallery in Southport (Evening: Amiens Cathedral) and the Welsh national collection.

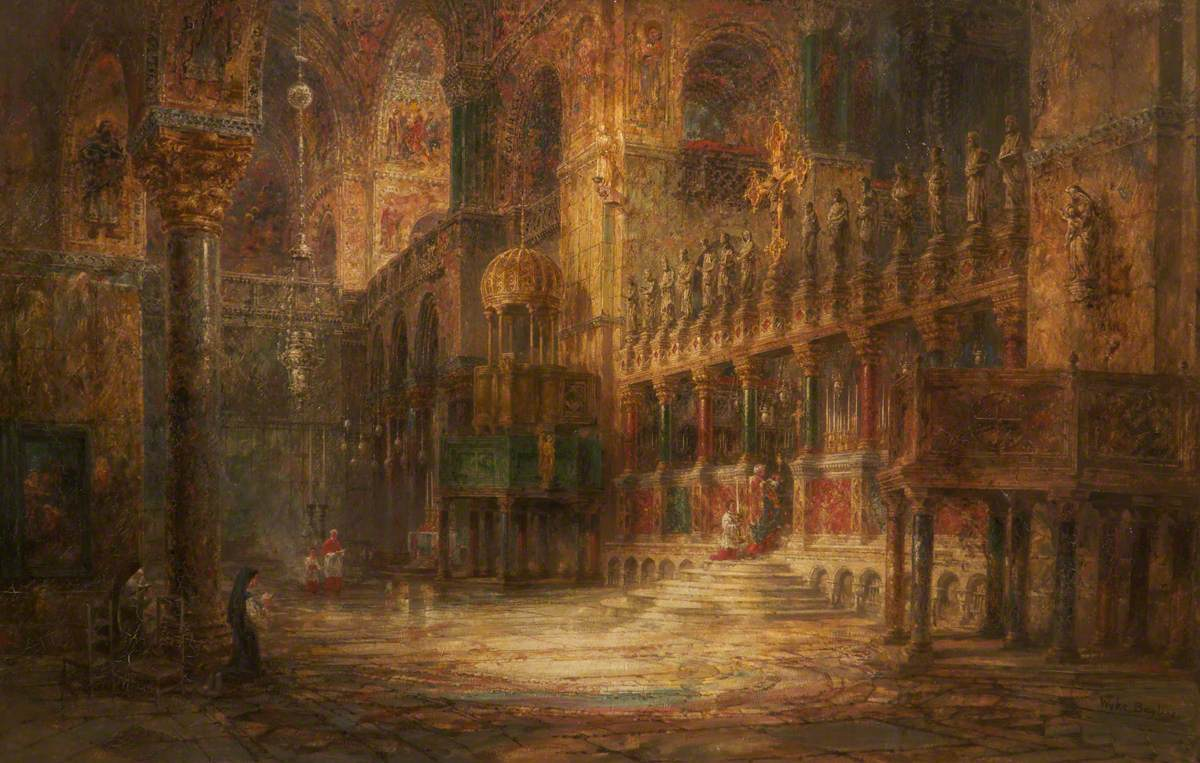
The Basilica of St Mark's, Venice, Interior, 1877

He was also an author, publishing a number of books of art critique, accounts of changing depictions of Jesus through the ages, and a volume of poems. In an 1889 review of his book The Enchanted Island: The Venice of Titian and Other Studies in Art, Oscar Wilde wrote "Mr. Wyke Bayliss is as much Mr. Whistler's superior as a writer as he is his inferior as a painter and an artist." Bayliss succeeded James McNeill Whistler as president of the Royal Society of British Artists (RBA) in June 1888 when Whistler and his followers split from the society; however, there was acrimony throughout the remainder of 1888 because the society's constitution allowed the defeated incumbent to formally stay in office until year's end.

Bayliss had initially supported Whistler's nomination to the committee, but soon led the majority who disagreed with the latter's radical plans, and as president restored its running to traditional lines. He was nevertheless notably supportive of some innovations, such as defending the status of women as professional artists and advocating the inclusion of the "new and strange" in RBA exhibitions. He held the post until his death in 1906. He was elected a fellow of the Society of Antiquaries in 1870, to the Royal West of England Academy in 1904, and received a knighthood in 1897. In 1899 he was president of the Ruskin Society of Birmingham ("the Society of the Rose"), which was founded by John Howard Whitehouse in 1896.

He won the Challenge Cup of the Surrey County Chess Association in 1886.

Bayliss married Elise Letitia Broad in 1858, but never had children. They lived at 7 North Road, Clapham Park in London, where he died in 1906 aged 70. He was buried at Streatham Cemetery and his funeral was attended by many artists including his successor as President of the RBA Alfred East and wreaths sent by, among others, Lawrence Alma-Tadema. His autobiography, Olives: the Reminiscences of a President, was posthumously published in the same year.
