= Wesley Spragg =

Wesley Spragg (13 February 1848 – 15 August 1930) was a New Zealand butter manufacturer and exporter, temperance campaigner, benefactor. He was born in Madeley, Shropshire, England, in 1848.
