= Haberdashers' Abraham Darby =

- (Abraham Darby Academy)
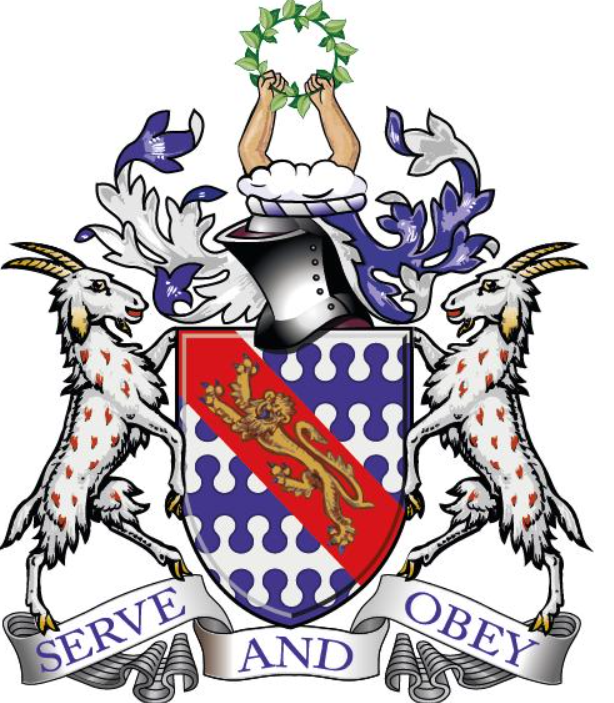
- Coat of arms of the Haberdashers' Company

Location
- Ironbridge Road; Madeley; Telford, Shropshire, TF7 5HX; England; 52.6341°N 2.4684°W

Information
- Type: Academy
- Motto: "Confident, Calm and Caring"
- Religious affiliation: None
- Established: 2009 (Academy)
- Founder: Abraham Darby
- Local authority: Telford and Wrekin
- Department for Education URN: 135582 Tables
- Ofsted: Reports
- Chair of Governors: James Penney
- Principal: Joanne Edgar
- Vice Principals: Nick Scott; EG Bediako; Clemency Price; David Hughes
- Staff: 144
- Gender: Coeducational
- Age: 11 to 18
- Enrolment: 1200
- Houses: Webb, Owen, Woodhall and Darwin
- Colours: Blue, green, red and black
- Local Authority: Telford and Wrekin
- Trust: Haberdashers' West Midlands Academy Trust
- Parent: Haberdashers' Adams Grammar School
- Website: https://www.haberdashersabrahamdarby.co.uk/

Haberdashers' Abraham Darby Academy in Telford, Shropshire, England, is a coeducational secondary school on Ironbridge Road in Madeley which was founded in 1937. It is named after Abraham Darby III and is situated one mile from the Iron Bridge which he built in 1779. In September 2008 the school was converted to an academy through a link to Haberdashers' Adams, and was accepted by the Department for Children, Schools and Families (DCSF). The school is a subsidiary of Haberdashers' Adams Grammar School in Newport. It part of the Haberdashers' West Midlands Academies Trust (HWMAT) group of schools. The academy is sponsored by the Worshipful Company of Haberdashers.

== History ==
The school was founded as Madeley Senior Council School, Hill Top, opened in 1927 with 400 mixed places. It became known as Madeley Modern School from 1944, was enlarged in 1958-59 and had 619 pupils by the end of 1959.

It amalgamated with Coalbrookdale High School in 1965 to form the Abraham Darby Comprehensive School. There were 1,244 pupils in 1980. The school has a musical tradition, particularly with the wind band and the Abraham Darby Showband, which has played in the Royal Albert Hall and at the Carnegie Hall in New York City. The school achieved Arts College status and again renamed itself, this time to the Abraham Darby School for the Performing Arts in 2003.

The new building began construction in late 2009 and completed in 2012. It was officially opened by Prince Edward on 11 October 2012.

In 2018, a new trend steming from the name change of Adams Grammar School to Haberdashers' Adams emerged and led to the name change from Abraham Darby Academy to Haberdashers' Abraham Darby as part to recognise the historical links with the Haberdashers' company and as a marketing strategy.

== Academy ==
Links between Haberdashers' Abraham Darby Academy and Haberdashers' Adams Grammar School at Newport are strong, with student and teacher exchanges, leadership training, mentoring systems, CPD Events, a common house system and the same uniform for all year groups. There are joint events, including those for sport, music, drama and academic events. The curriculum is supported by ICT, and each school has specialisms: Abraham Darby Academy with performing arts, business, enterprise and social sciences; Adams Grammar School with Science, Mathematics, English, Technology and MFL .

The joint project is supported by Telford and Wrekin Council, the DCSF, and the 300-year-old Haberdashers' Company as a sponsor. The two schools, although operating separately, will share governors. Part of the project will be a capital investment, and new school building by 2011.

ADA student uniform comprises a tie, and a blazer bearing the Haberdashers’ crest, identical to that of Adams Grammar.

== Notable alumni ==
- Former English super-middleweight professional boxer Richie Woodhall (attended during the 1980s).

=== Madeley Modern School ===
- Billy Wright, the former captain of Wolverhampton Wanderers F.C. and the England football team.

=== Coalbrookdale County High School ===
- Louis Kirby, political journalist, and editor from 1980 to 1986 of the London Evening Standard, and from 1974 to 1980 of The Evening News.
- Dame Lorna Muirhead, former president of the Royal College of Midwives and Lord Lieutenant of Merseyside 2006 to 2017.
- Edith Pargeter OBE, author who wrote The Cadfael Chronicles between 1977 and 1994, which are set in Shropshire.

== Notable staff ==
=== Madeley Modern School ===
- Mary Whitehouse, founder of the National Viewers' and Listeners' Association, was art teacher and senior mistress there from 1960 until 1964 when she began to concentrate full-time on her TV clean-up campaigns.
