= Madeley, Shropshire =

Town and civil parish Shropshire, England

Coordinates: 52.637°N 2.448°W

Madeley
- Town and civil parish
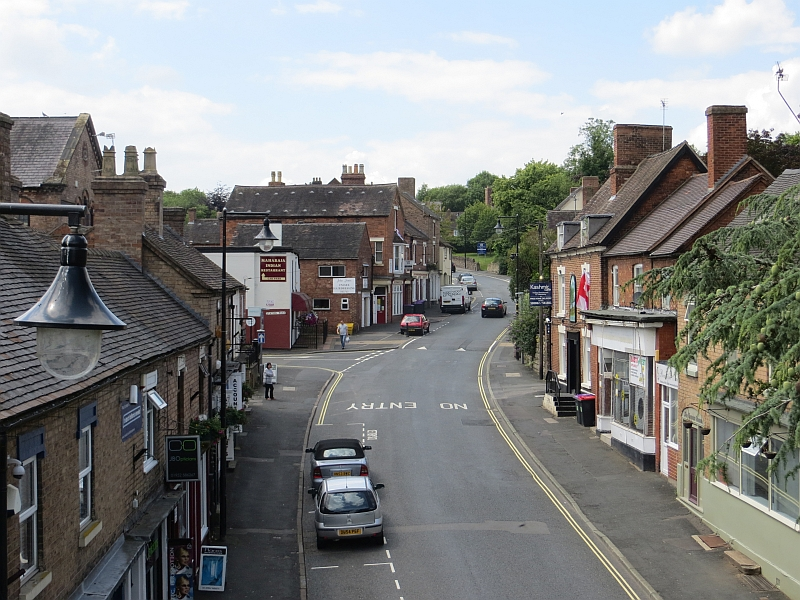
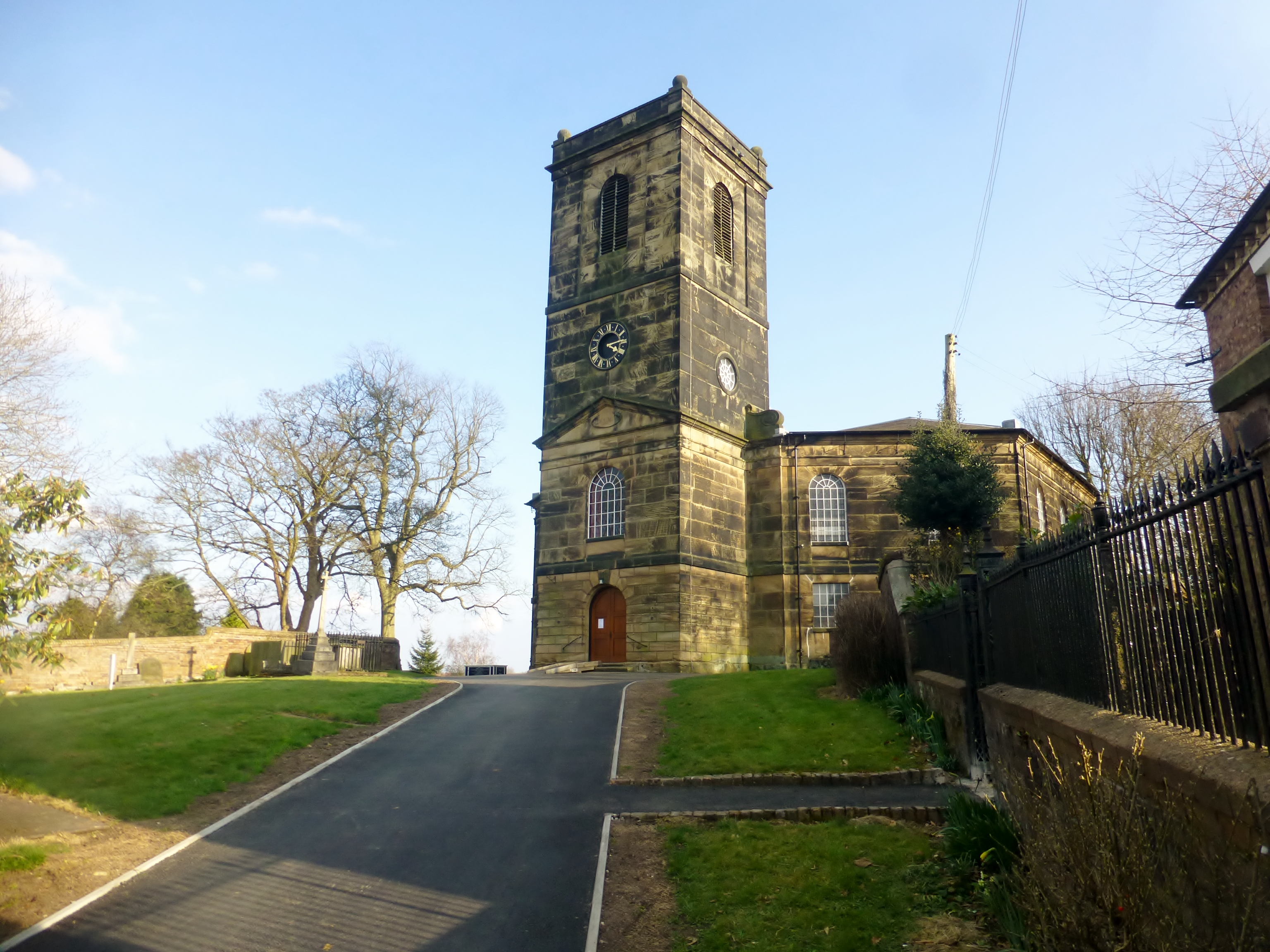
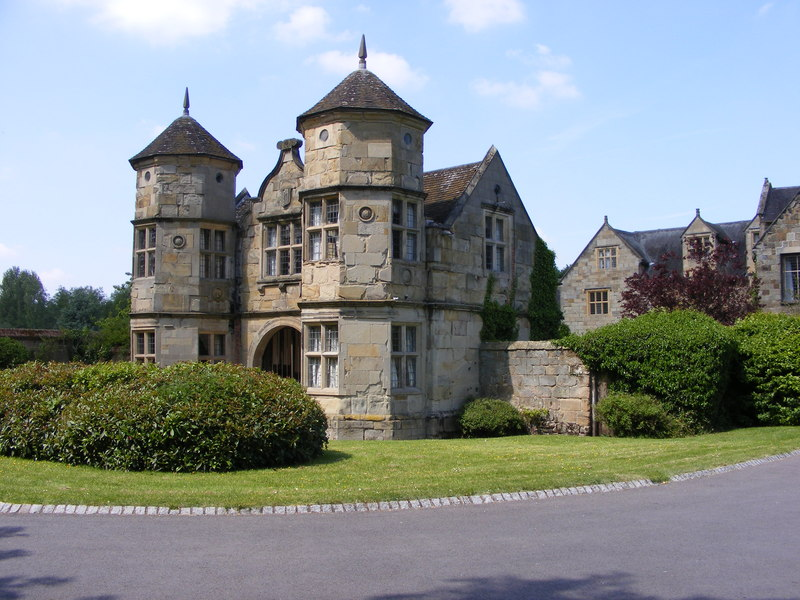
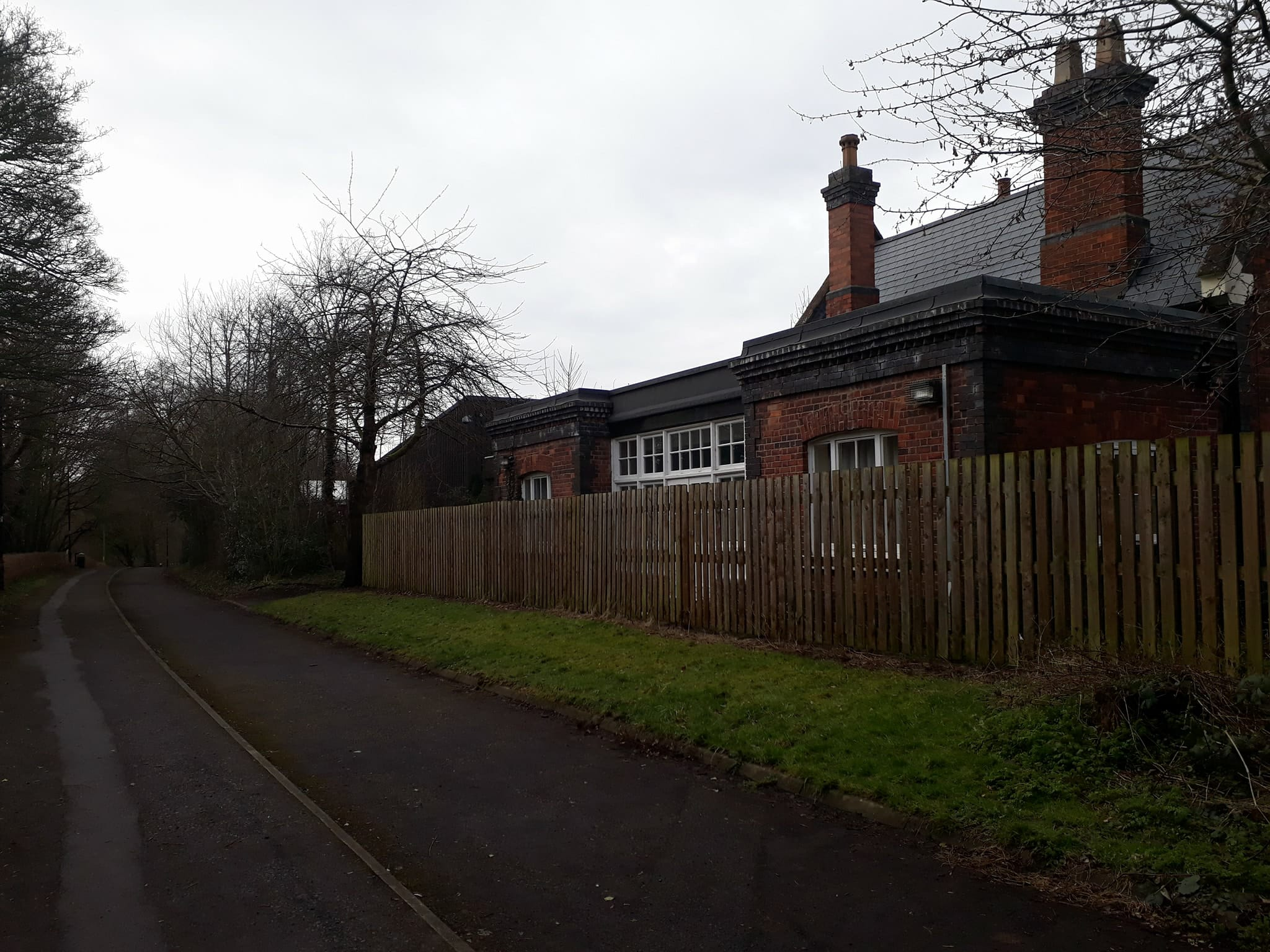
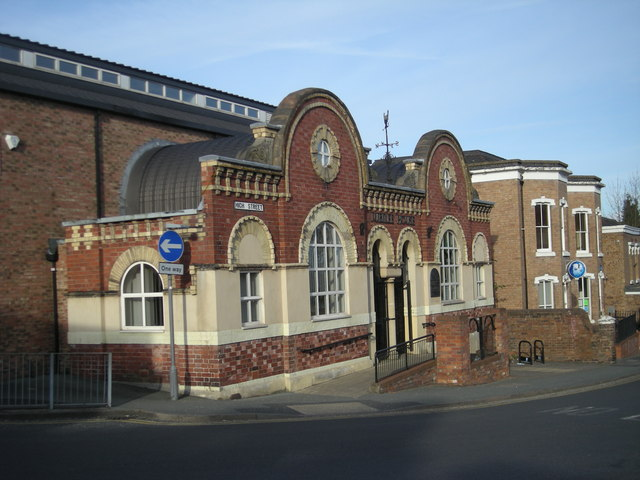
- From the top clockwise: Madeley High Street from the Silkin Way, Madeley Court, Jubilee Hall, Madeley Market Old Station Building and St. Michael's Church

- Location within Shropshire
- Population: 18,774 (2021 Census)
- OS grid reference: SJ697044
- Civil parish: Madeley
- Unitary authority: Telford and Wrekin
- Ceremonial county: Shropshire
- Region: West Midlands
- Country: England
- Sovereign state: United Kingdom
- Areas of the town: List: Hill Top; Sutton Hill; Woodside
- Post town: TELFORD
- Postcode district: TF7
- Dialling code: 01952
- Police: West Mercia
- Fire: Shropshire
- Ambulance: West Midlands
- UK Parliament: Telford
- Website: Official website

Madeley is a historic market town and civil parish in the borough of Telford and Wrekin, Shropshire, England. The parish had a population of 18,774 at the 2021 census.

Madeley is recorded in the Domesday Book, having been founded before the 8th century. Historically, Madeley's industrial activity has largely been in mining, and later, manufacturing, which is still a large employer in the town, along with service industries. Parts of the parish fall within the UNESCO World Heritage Site of Ironbridge Gorge, the site of The Iron Bridge, and a key area in the development of Industry.

== History ==
The name Madeley is derived from the Old English madalēah meaning 'Mada's wood or clearing'.

The settlement of Madeley is recorded as far back as the Domesday Book. The town was founded prior to the 8th century, and subsequently became a market town in the 13th century.

Sigward, a local ruler in the time of King Æthelbald of Mercia, is said to have held 3 hides of land at Madeley. Between 727 and 736 he sold his holdings to Mildburh, daughter of Merewalh, sub-king of the Magonsæte. She was the founder and first head of Wenlock Abbey. The monastery was refounded as a Cluniac priory after the Norman Conquest but the manor of Madeley belonged to the church of Wenlock, throughout the Middle Ages, until the dissolution of the monasteries. It passed to the Crown in 1540 and in 1544 was sold to Robert Broke, a prominent lawyer and politician from Claverley.

Mining of coal began before 1322, and the extraction of ironstone had begun by 1540.

In 1645, during the English Civil War, the town was home to a garrison of Royalist soldiers. The post was abandoned after the fall of Shrewsbury, and two months later Parliamentary forces occupied the parish church. After the Battle of Worcester in 1651, King Charles II hid in a barn adjoining Upper House in Church Street.

In the 17th century, Madeley was a small market town, but local tradesmen began to specialise, working in the river trade and in mining. In the 18th century, the north end of The Iron Bridge was built between Madeley Wood and Broseley and the settlement of Ironbridge grew by it, which took some of the commercial trade away from the old town of Madeley, including its market.

Nevertheless, as an important part of the Coalbrookdale Coalfield, Madeley was home to nearly 100 known and named pits in the old Madeley parish with coal mining continuing until the early 1900s. In 1864, the Brick Kiln Leasow mine, mined for ironstone that was used to feed the furnaces at Blists Hill, witnessed a tragic accident that claimed the lives of nine miners. The victims are remembered today as the Nine Men of Madeley.

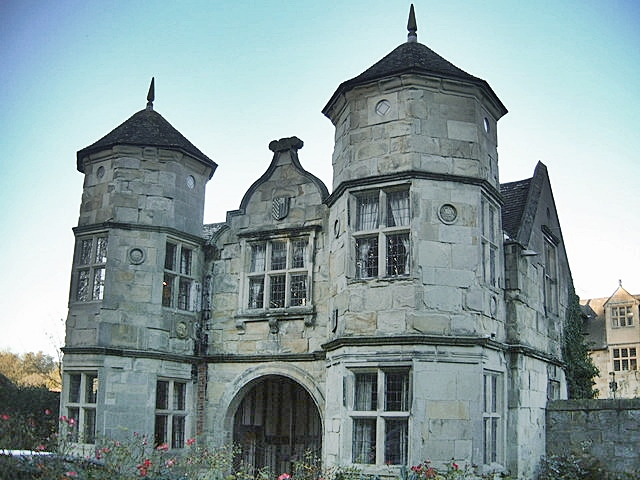
Madeley Court Gatehouse

In the 1970s, significant construction of new housing and recreation areas was undertaken by the Dawley Development Corporation, later known as the Telford Development Corporation, as part of the development of Telford New Town.

Several of Madeley's historical sites of interest are waypoints on the South Telford Heritage Trail including: Madeley Court, Madeley High Street, Jubilee House, St Michael's Church, Madeley Windmill and the Madeley Salop Railway Station. The gatehouse to Madeley Court is a Grade I listed building.

== Governance ==
Madeley is located within the civil parish and ward of the same name. The ward is within the Telford constituency, which since the July 2024 general election has been represented by Labour MP, Shaun Davies.

Madeley Town Council covers the town of Madeley and the neighbouring residential areas of Sutton Hill and Woodside, plus the industrial areas of Halesfield and Tweedale. There are four electoral wards, namely, Academy (which elects one councillor), Cuckoo Oak (five councillors), Madeley Village (five councillors) and Woodside (six councillors). Following the 2023 local government election, at which all seats were uncontested, the composition of Madeley Town Council was 14 Labour councillors and one Independent with two seats vacant.

The town is administered at borough level by Telford and Wrekin unitary authority, and is represented as part of the Madeley and Sutton Hill ward by 2 Labour and 1 Conservative councillor.

The parish of Madeley formerly incorporated Ironbridge, which has since become part of the new parish of The Gorge.

== Geography ==
Madeley shown within Telford in Maroon.

Madeley is situated in the southern part of the new town of Telford, to the north of Ironbridge and the River Severn. Coalport, a part of the parish of Madeley can be found to the west of the town, and the modern Telford Town Centre is north of the settlement. The local area has reserves of coal and ironstone.

Part of the UNESCO World Heritage Site of the Ironbridge Gorge falls within the Parish of Madeley. The majority of the site is within the parish of The Gorge, named for the Ironbridge Gorge, which is bridged by The Iron Bridge.

== Demography ==
At the 2001 census, the population of the parish of Madeley was 17,935. Of this number, 8,190 were economically active, and of them, 7,477 were in employment. The ethnicity of the population was as follows: 96% of the population was found to be White, and 1.9% Asian, or Asian British. 1.3% of the population was mixed race, 0.6% Black or Black British and a further 0.2% Chinese.

In terms of religion: 77% of the population are Christian, and 14.4% are of no religion. 0.7% of the population are Muslim, 0.5% are Sikh, 0.3% are Hindu, and 0.1% are Buddhist.

== Economy ==
Historically, Madeley was a mining town serving the now defunct Kemberton Colliery. It was also home to the Madeley Wood Company. By 2001, manufacturing was still a large employer in the town, with 33.1% of parish residents employed in that area. 20.7% were employed in wholesale, retail and hotels, and 11.8% in finance and business services. 5.3% of residents were unemployed.

== Transport ==
The B4373 runs through the town, and the A4169 runs along its northern edge. The nearest motorway is the M54, which connects Telford to the West Midlands conurbation and the rest of the motorway network. Most bus services are provided by Arriva Midlands, and a community bus service is provided.

Near Madeley is Madeley Junction, a railway junction and its accompanying signal box. The line from this junction runs to Lightmoor Junction, and was used to carry coal to Ironbridge Power Station. The nearest National Rail station to the town is Telford Central. It was also served the Coalport Branch Line from 1860 until 1952. The station remains intact and the former trackbed forms part of the Silkin Way.

== Education ==
There are a number of nurseries and primary schools in Madeley, and two secondary schools: Haberdashers' Abraham Darby and Madeley Academy. Haughton School, a special school for students aged five to eleven is located in the town.

== Religious sites ==
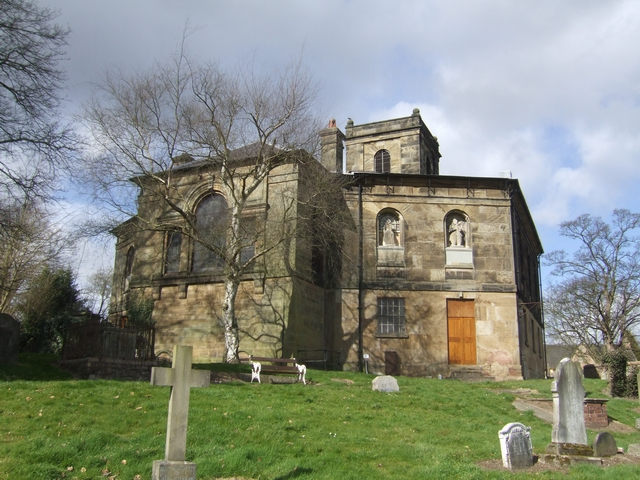
St Michael's Church

There are three churches in the centre of Madeley: St Michael's, a Church of England parish church in the Diocese of Hereford, which was designed in its present form by Thomas Telford; Madeley Baptist Church; and the Roman Catholic St Mary's Church, part of the Diocese of Shrewsbury. The Fletcher Methodist Centre can be found in the town, and on the Tweedale Industrial Estate near Madeley is the Springfield Christian Fellowship.

== Notable people ==
Residents of the town of Madeley have included Sir Basil Brooke (1576–1646), of Madeley Court, who was instrumental in the Industrial Revolution. He was born in the local manor, which he later inherited. His grandfather, Robert Broke, was a former Speaker of the House of Commons.

Mary Bosanquet Fletcher (1739–1815), one of the first female Methodist preachers, and John William Fletcher (1729–1785), her husband and fellow Methodist who was Vicar of Madeley, had a joint ministry in the parish in the 18th century. John's iron tombstone is in the parish churchyard.

Major Charles Allix Lavington Yate (1872–1914), is another former resident of the town, who earned the Victoria Cross in the First World War. He was kinsman of Colonel Sir Charles Yate, 1st Baronet, (1849–1940) British soldier and administrator in India, who retired to Madeley Hall and is buried at the churchyard at St Michael's Church, Madeley

=== Other notable people ===
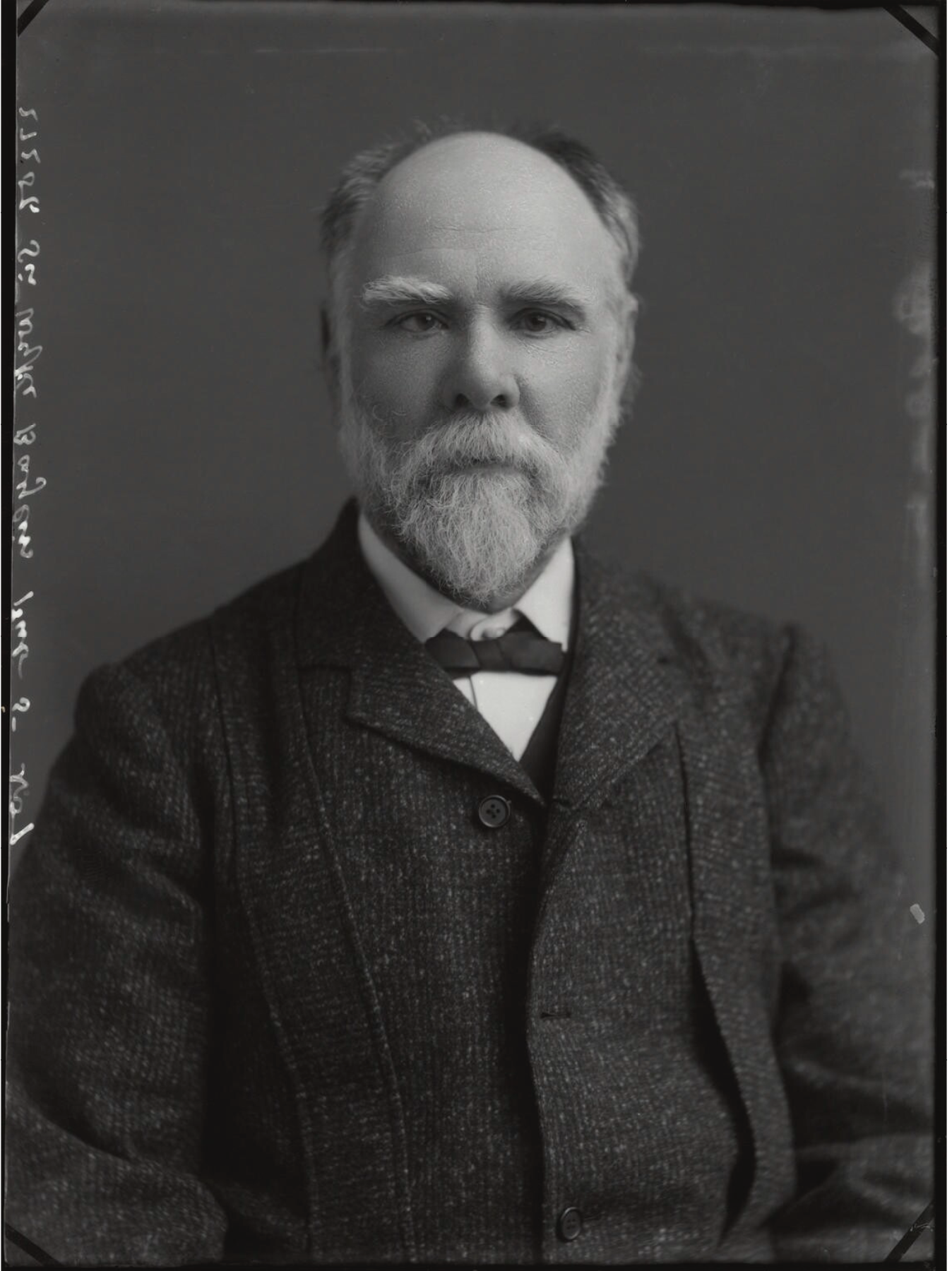
Sir Wyke Bayliss, 1897

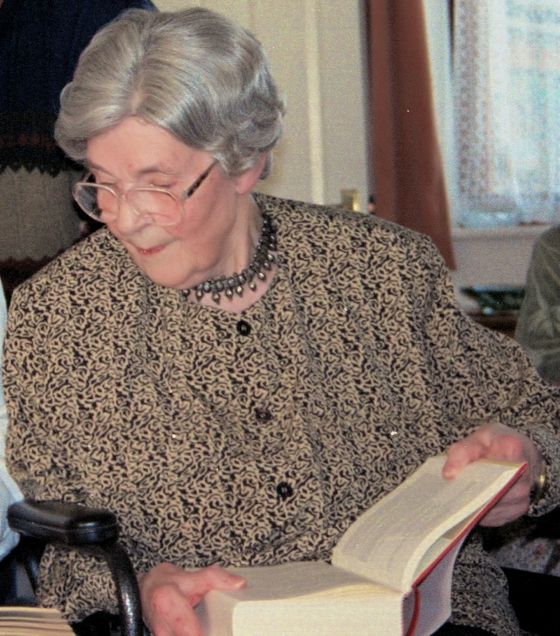
Ellis Peters, 1995

- John Bromley (died 1717), Anglican-turned-Roman Catholic clergyman and translator, died at Madeley.
- Abraham Darby I (1677–1717), pioneering ironmaster, was tenant at Madeley Court where he died.
- Richard Reynolds (1735–1816), ironmaster, owned Madeley Court and lived there 1781 / 1804.
- Abraham Darby III (1750–1789), ironmaster, grandson of Abraham Darby I, owned Madeley Court 1774–81.
- James Glazebrook (1744–1803) English cleric, controversialist, and writer, born there.
- Samuel Thorp (c.1765-1838) clockmaker, born there.
- Joseph Anstice (1808–1836), classical scholar, essayist, hymn writer, born at Madeley Wood Hall.
- Sir Wyke Bayliss (1835–1906) British painter, author and poet, born there.
- John Fletcher Moulton, Baron Moulton (1844–1921), judge, Liberal politician and writer, born there.
- Wesley Spragg (1848–1930) New Zealand butter manufacturer and temperance campaigner, born there.
- Harold William Timperley (1890–1964) English author of local history and topographical studies.
- Mary Whitehouse (1910–2001), taught art at Madeley Modern School (now the Haberdashers' Abraham Darby) from 1960 to 1964, taking responsibility for sex education. Shocked at the moral beliefs of her pupils, she became concerned about what she and many others perceived as declining moral standards in the British media, especially in the BBC.
- Edith Mary Pargeter, (pen name Ellis Peters) (1913–1995), author of history and historical fiction, lived in Madeley 1956 / 1995.

==== Sports ====
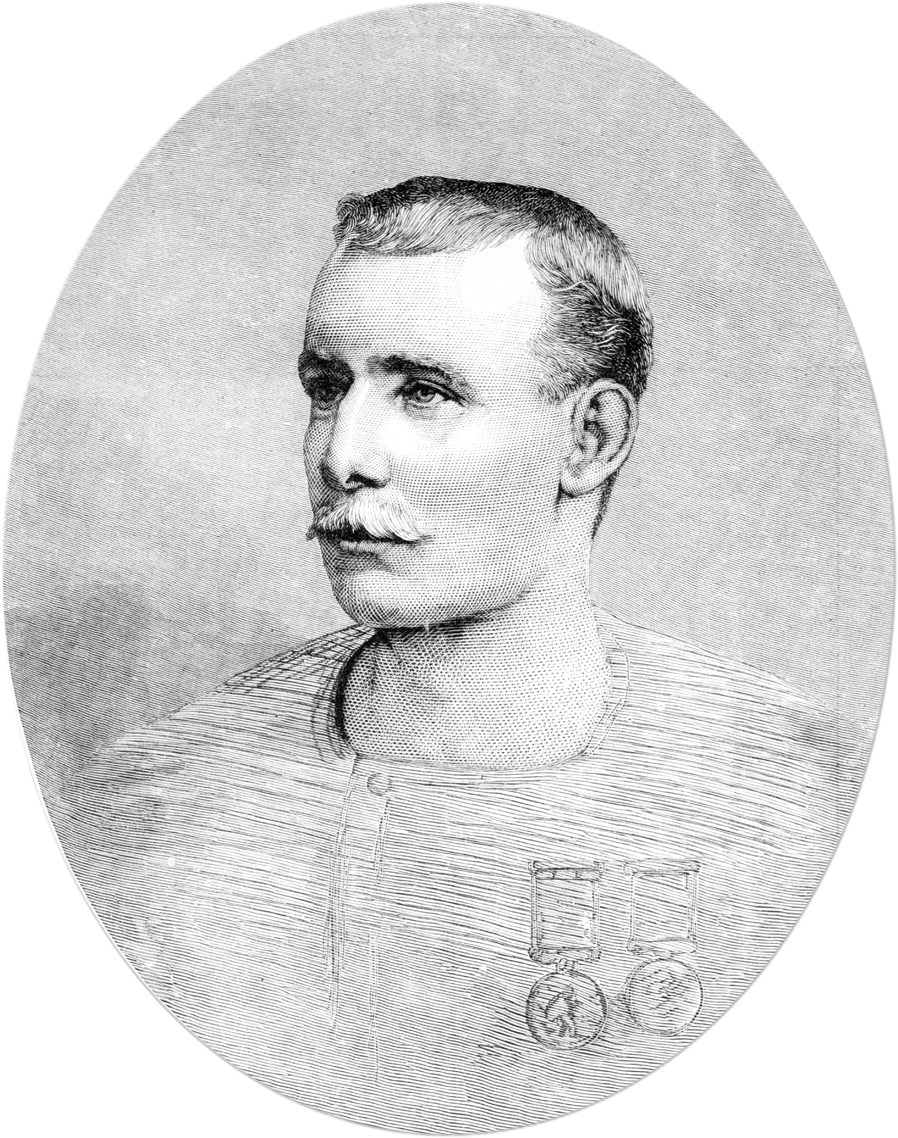
Captain Matthew Webb, 1883

- Matthew Webb (1848–1883), pioneer Channel swimmer, lived in High Street in childhood before family moved to Coalbrookdale.
- Richard Guy (1877-1938), former football player, outside-right who made 24 league appearances for Bradford City and Leeds City.
- William Dyas (1872–1940), first-class cricketer, local businessman and councillor representing Madeley on both Wenlock Borough and Shropshire County Councils, born and died there, at Upper House.
- Billy Wright (1924–1994) former captain of Wolves and the England football team, attended Madeley Senior School, now Haberdashers' Abraham Darby. Made 490 appearances for Wolves. and 105 for England
- Richie Woodhall (born 1968), former boxer, bronze medallist at the 1988 Summer Olympics and WBC super-middleweight champion, attended Abraham Darby School, now Haberdashers' Abraham Darby
- Rob Edwards, (born 1982) former Wolves and Wales full-back, 228 appearances, 100 for Wolves and 15 for Wales, born there.

== See also ==
- Listed buildings in Madeley, Shropshire
