= Robert Richard Anstice =

English mathematician and clergyman (1813-1853)

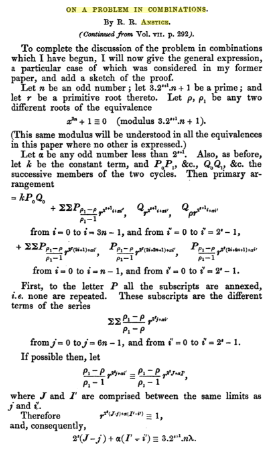
- First page of the second part of the article On a problem of combinations (1853) from the Cambridge and Dublin Mathematical Journal.
- Born: 9 April 1813; Madeley, Shropshire, England
- Died: 17 December 1853 (aged 40); Wigginton, Hertfordshire, England
- Resting place: St. Michael's Church, Madeley, Shropshire; 52.633738°N 2.449895°W
- Education: Christ Church, Oxford
- Known for: Combinatorics
- Scientific career
- Fields: Mathematics

Robert Richard Anstice (1813–1853) was an English clergyman and mathematician who wrote two remarkable papers on combinatorics, published the same year he died in the Cambridge and Dublin Mathematical Journal. He pioneered the use of primitive roots in this field, anticipating the work of Eugen Netto on Steiner's triplets.

Anstice studied at Christ Church, Oxford, where he graduated in 1835, receiving a Master's in 1837. Nothing is known about his life in the next ten years. In 1846, he was ordained priest, and in the following year he became rector of Wigginton, Hertfordshire. He died there in 1853, and is buried, under a cast iron tombstone, in the churchyard at St Michael's Church, Madeley, Shropshire.

== Bibliography ==
- Anderson, Ian; Crilly, Tony (2013). "Robert Richard Anstice (1813–1853): a Hertfordshire bicentenary". Journal of the British Society for the History of Mathematics. 28 (2): 75–83. doi:10.1080/17498430.2013.727146. S2CID 121540113.
- Craik, Alex D.D. (2008). Mr Hopkins' Men: Cambridge Reform and British Mathematics in the 19th Century. Springer. ISBN 978-1-84800-132-9.
- Crilly, Tony (2004). "The Cambridge Mathematical Journal and its descendants: the linchpin of a research community in the early and mid-Victorian Age". Historia Mathematica. 31 (4): 455–497. doi:10.1016/j.hm.2004.03.001. ISSN 0315-0860.
