= St Michael's Church, Madeley =

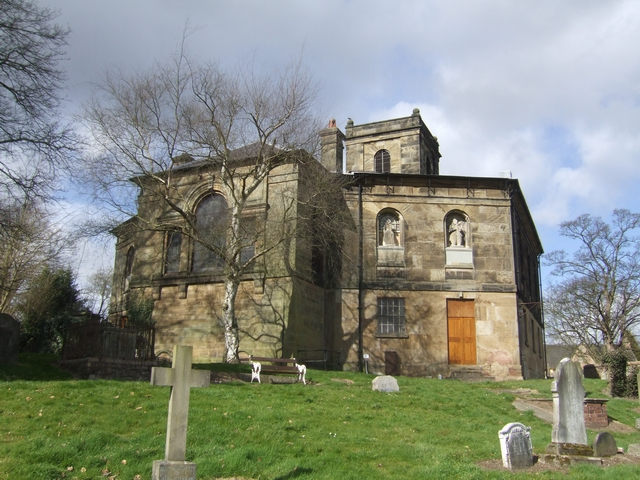
- St Michael's Church, Madeley
- 52°38′1.4″N 2°27′0.9″W
- OS grid reference: SJ 69625 04091
- Location: Madeley, Shropshire
- Country: England
- Denomination: Church of England
- Website: https://www.stmichaelsmadeley.org/

History
- Dedication: St. Michael

Administration
- Diocese: Diocese of Hereford
- Parish: Madeley

St Michael's Church, Madeley, is located near the centre of Madeley, Shropshire, England. It is one of three places of worship that constitute the Parish of Madeley, a Church of England parish. The parish is part of the Diocese of Hereford.

== History ==
The church was designed by Thomas Telford and built in 1796. It was the rebuild of an older church, among whose Vicars had been John William Fletcher, whose iron tombstone is in the churchyard.

== Architecture ==
St Michael's Church is an octagonal building with a square tower. Both the church building and the churchyard's northern boundary wall were listed in 1983, being Grade II* and Grade II listed respectively.

== War memorials ==
- West end - two carved wooden panels, at their base two brass plaques listing parishioners who died serving in World War I, with figures of St Luke, St Maurice and St George on one side and St Michael, St Joan of Arc and St Barbara on the other.
- West end - stone plaque, removed from closed church of St Paul's, Aqueduct, listing men local to that church who died in both World Wars.
- North wall - marble plaque listing men of Madeley parish died in First World War.
- Plaque to Lieutenant Frederick John Briscoe, killed at Ypres 1915.
- Plaque to Lieutenant John Spencer Ruscombe Anstice, killed at Gallipoli 1915.

== Churchyard ==
The churchyard contains several cast iron tombstones, including those of J. W. Fletcher (died 1785) and Robert Richard Anstice (died 1853), a stone tombstone of Thomas Parker (inventor) and the war graves of seven British Army soldiers of World War I and two soldiers and an airman of World War II. The churchyard is also the resting place of the Nine Men of Madeley—miners, of whom the youngest was aged 12 years, who lost their lives at the Brick Kiln Leasow ironstone mine in 1864. William Dyas (1872–1940), first-class cricketer and local businessman and politician, is buried in a family vault here.

== See also ==
- Listed buildings in Madeley, Shropshire
