= Madeley Court =

16th-century house in Shropshire, England

Coordinates: 52.6433°N 2.4515°W

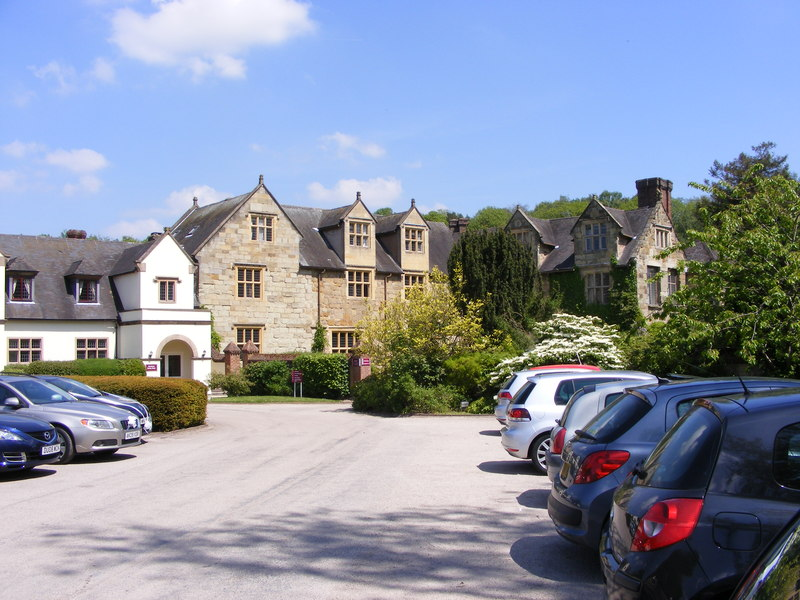
Madeley Court

Madeley Court is a 16th-century country house in Madeley, Shropshire, England which was originally built as a grange to the medieval Wenlock Priory. It has since been restored as a hotel.

The house is ashlar built in two storeys to an L-shaped plan and is a Grade II* listed building. To the south west of the house is a 16th-century gatehouse which is separately grade I listed.

== History ==
After the Dissolution of the Monasteries, the manor of Madeley was acquired in 1544 from Wenlock Priory by Sir Robert Brooke, afterwards Speaker of the House of Commons, who built his house there in 1553 on the site of an earlier monastic grange. The manor passed down in the Brooke family.

In 1651 the house was occupied by a Roman Catholic, Francis Wolfe, when he received a visit from Charles II, accompanied by Richard Penderel, when escaping after the Battle of Worcester. The house then had several hiding places but Wolfe advised the house was no longer safe for concealment and let the king stay overnight in a barn (now part of Upper House) while Wolfe and Penderel unsuccessfully scouted the Severn crossings which were patrolled by Parliamentary troops. Following this, the King and Penderal returned to the latter's home at Boscobel House, from where the King subsequently headed for exile in France.

In 1727 Basil Brooke died a minor and the manor was divided between his two sisters, Catherine and Rose. When Catherine died her half passed to her husband John Unett Smitheman and from him to their son John who sold it in 1774 to Abraham Darby III. In 1781 Darby sold it to his former brother-in-law Richard Reynolds, his partner in the Coalbrookdale Company. Rose's half was subdivided between her four daughters. By 1781, Richard Reynolds had gradually acquired those portions as well, thus reuniting the holding under one name in 1780–81.

Eminent as Quaker philanthropist and ironmaster, Reynolds died in 1816. His real property then descended to his son Joseph and his daughter Hannah Mary Rathbone. In 1824, on the partition of the inheritance, Madeley came to Joseph who conveyed it to his three sons in 1853: a seventh to Thomas Reynolds, three sevenths to Joseph Gulson Reynolds, and three sevenths to Dr. William Reynolds. Thomas (d. 1854) left his seventh to his two brothers.

Between 1871 and 1889 the manor passed by various means to the Ball family, descendants of Joseph Reynolds's daughter Rebecca and her husband (and second cousin) Joseph Ball. In 1891 eleven members of the family settled their shares or interests in the manor on trustees, the leading trustee being the Revd. C. R. Ball, locally reputed lord of the manor. The manor remained in the hands of the Ball trustees for the rest of its existence, probably until c. 1940; it became the custom to appoint two trustees from the Revd. A. W. Ball's descendants, two from those of his brother Canon C. R. Ball. Canon Ball died in 1918, the leading trustee thereafter apparently being his nephew E. A. R. Ball (d. 1928).

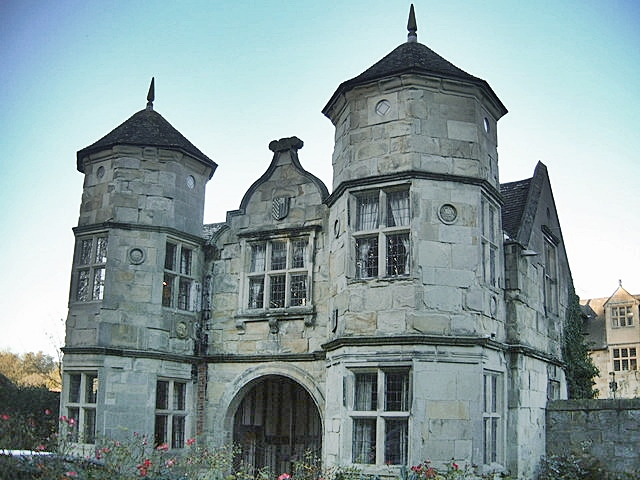
Gatehouse to Madeley Court

The land on which Madeley Court stands was separated from the manor in 1540. The earliest part of the building dates from the 13th century and was occupied by a variety of tenants until John Brooke, son of Sir Robert, inherited it c.1572. He renovated and extended it and further remodelling took place in the 17th century. A large formal garden was created, surrounded by red brick walls, in which stands an elaborate sundial. The sundial is separately grade II* listed. The house was partly tenanted by Abraham Darby I from 1709 until his death.

After Basil Brooke's premature death in 1727 the house went into decline. Tenanted by a succession of gentleman and yeoman farmers it suffered from the ravages of coal mining. In 1880 it was described as ‘fast going to decay’ and ‘a scene of utter desolation’. Some repairs were made in 1904 but by the 1970s the hall range and garden walls were in a ruinous condition, the gatehouse was cracking and by 1977 none of the buildings were habitable.

In 1973 Telford Development Corporation embarked on a restoration project, making the house structurally sound and weatherproof in 1976–79 and later partly dismantling and rebuilding the gatehouse. The property was later converted into a hotel under the guidance of architect Jim Roberts. It is no longer the Mercure Madeley Court Hotel.

== See also ==
- Listed buildings in Madeley, Shropshire
