= Vitrified tile =

Type of ceramic tile

A vitrified tile is a ceramic tile with very low porosity, produced by vitrification of the tile body during firing at high temperatures (typically 1,200–1,250 °C). Under ISO 13006, a "fully vitrified" tile has a water absorption coefficient of no more than 0.5% by mass. Vitrified tiles are an alternative to marble and granite flooring and are often used outdoors due to their water and frost resistance.

Vitrified tile is made by hydraulic pressing a mixture of clay, quartz, feldspar, and silica, then firing to produce a vitreous (glass-like) surface. The result is a dense, single-mass body with very low porosity. Different clay bodies reach vitrification at different temperatures.

== Types ==
Vitrified tiles are commonly classified into four types:

- Soluble salt vitrified tiles are screen-printed with soluble mineral salts and then polished. They are among the most economical vitrified tiles.
- Double charge vitrified tiles are fed through a press that applies a double layer of pigment, producing a design layer 3–4 mm thick. This process limits design complexity but produces a long-wearing surface suitable for heavy-traffic commercial applications.
- Full body vitrified tiles contain pigment throughout the entire thickness of the tile body. This makes chips and scratches less noticeable and makes them suitable for high-traffic zones, but the manufacturing process is more costly.
- Glazed vitrified tiles (GVT) have a ceramic glazed surface, often applied using digital printing technology. They can replicate the appearance of wood grain, bamboo, slate, or stone. Digital printing has significantly reduced the cost of glazed vitrified tiles in recent years.

== Manufacturing and industry ==
Vitrified tile manufacturing is concentrated primarily in Asia. China is the world's largest producer of ceramic tiles overall, while India is the second-largest producer, consumer, and exporter. Global ceramic tile production (of which vitrified tiles are a major subset) was approximately 14,950 million square metres in 2024, with Asia accounting for about 73% of worldwide output.

In India, the city of Morbi in Gujarat is the principal manufacturing hub, producing up to 90% of the country's ceramic tiles (including vitrified tiles) across more than 1,800 manufacturing units. India produced approximately 2,400 million square metres of ceramic tiles in 2024. In Europe, Italy (particularly the Sassuolo district in Emilia-Romagna) and Spain (Castellón province) are historically significant production centres.

== Standards ==
Vitrified tiles are classified and tested according to several international and national standards:

- ISO 13006:2018 defines ceramic tile classifications based on water absorption and manufacturing method. Fully vitrified tiles belong to Group BIa (dry-pressed, water absorption ≤ 0.5%).
- IS 15622:2017 is the Indian standard for pressed ceramic tiles, specifying requirements for dimensional tolerance, surface quality, and mechanical and chemical properties.
- EN 14411 is the corresponding European standard, harmonised with ISO 13006.

== See also ==
- Ceramic tile
- Porcelain tile
- Flooring
- Vitrification
