= South Telford Heritage Trail =

Heritage trail in Shropshire, England

Coordinates: 52°40′14″N 2°26′49″W

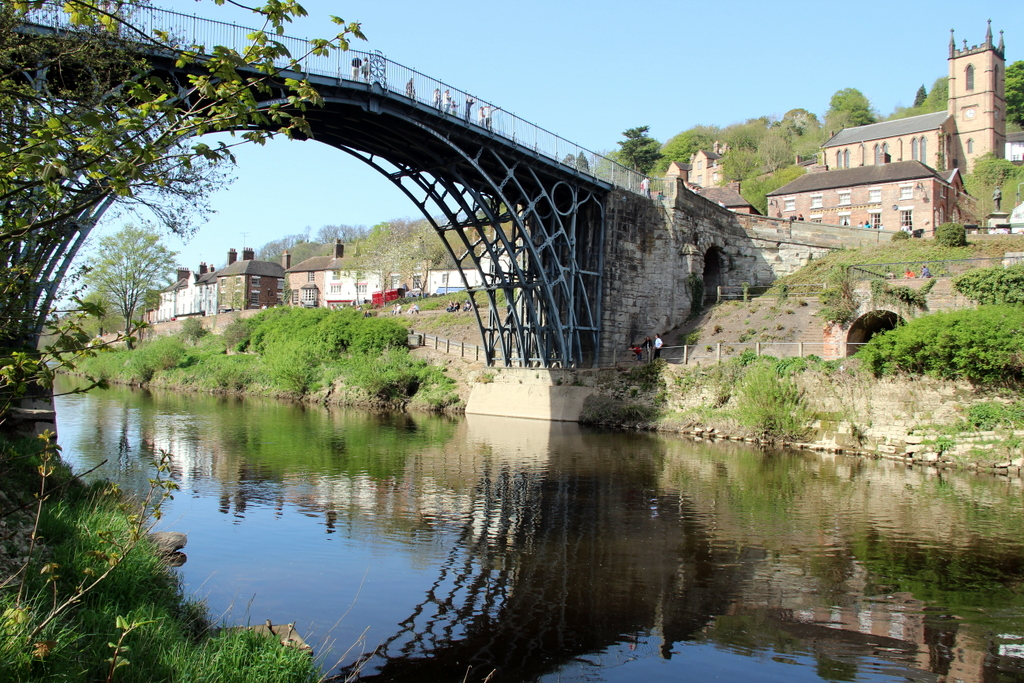
- Iron Bridge and St Luke's Church, Ironbridge, part of the walk's route
- Length: 12.2 miles (19.6 km)
- Location: Telford, Shropshire, England
- Trailheads: Telford Town Park
- Use: Hiking
- Season: All year

The South Telford Heritage Trail is a circular, waymarked walking route that passes by forty-nine heritage sites in the English town of Telford.

== The route ==
The trail begins and ends in Telford Town Park and passes through the parishes of Stirchley & Brookside, Madeley, Dawley Hamlets and the Ironbridge Gorge. The route follows the remains of a network of canals, tramways, railways, coal-mines, brickworks, potteries and ironworks that once flourished in the area. The trail can be walked in its entirety in 5–6 hours.

== History ==
Telford was established as a new town in 1968. Within its boundaries it incorporated many old settlements and communities, some dating back to the Domesday Book. During the 18th and 19th centuries the area was noted for its coal mines, iron works, china factories and brickworks.

By the beginning of the 20th century much of this industry had declined and by the 1960s, what remained was a legacy of uncapped mineshafts, derelict buildings, abandoned quarries, spoil heaps and pit mounds. The development of Telford and thoughtful landscaping has removed or hidden many of these scars. However, throughout the area of South Telford there remains a wealth of heritage sites. These include the canals, railways, mines, ironworks, houses and fine buildings associated with the area's industrial past. Many of these heritage sites are easily missed by the casual walker and their contributions to the rich history of the area are less well known.

== Aims of the Trail ==
The aim of the South Telford Heritage Trail is to bring attention the area's history by offering a self-guided walking route that links known and lesser known heritage sites within South Telford and to provide information about each site.

== The Heritage Sites ==
The forty-nine heritage sites that the trail passes are as follows:

No.	Heritage Site
1.	Malinslee Chapel
2.	Randlay Pool
3.	Blue Pool
4.	Stirchley Chimney
5.	Stirchley Grange Colliery
6.	Northwood Terrace
7.	Rose and Crown Public House
8.	Stirchley Village School
9.	St James' Church, Stirchley
10.	Stirchley Hall
11.	Route of the London North Western Railway Branch Line to Coalport
12.	The Aqueduct
13.	St Paul's Church, Aqueduct
14.	Foster's Row and Britannia Inn
15.	Madeley Salop Railway Station
16.	Madeley Windmill
17.	Madeley Court
18.	Madeley High Street
19.	Jubilee House, Madeley
20.	St Michael's Church, Madeley
21.	All Nations Public House
22.	Lee Dingle Bridge
23.	Blists Hill Tunnel
24.	Hay Inclined Plane, Blists Hill
25.	Jackfield and Coalport Memorial Footbridge
26.	Maws Tile Works
27.	Craven Dunnill Encaustic Tile Works
28.	Jackfield Sidings and Severn Valley Railway
29.	Station Hotel and Ironbridge and Broseley Railway Station
30.	The Iron Bridge
31.	The Wharfage, Ironbridge
32.	Coalbrookdale Railway Station
33.	View of Coalbrookdale
34.	Quaker Burial Ground, Coalbrookdale
35.	Darby Houses and Tea Kettle Row, Coalbrookdale
36.	Great Western Railway Viaduct, Coalbrookdale
37.	Jiggers Bank and Toll House
38.	New Pool
39.	Rough Park Way
40.	Lightmoor Crossing
41.	Tub Boat Bridge
42.	Shropshire Canal
43.	Castle Pools
44.	Dawley Castle Site
45.	Stirchley Wesleyan Chapel
46.	Dawley and Stirchley Railway Station
47.	Shropshire Canal
48.	Ironworks Forge
49.	Stone Row

These sites also act as trail waypoints.

== Funding ==
The trail was funded by grants from the Heritage Lottery Fund and Stirchley & Brookside Parish Council.
