= Stirchley and Brookside =

Civil parish in Shropshire, England

Coordinates: 52.652°N 2.435°W

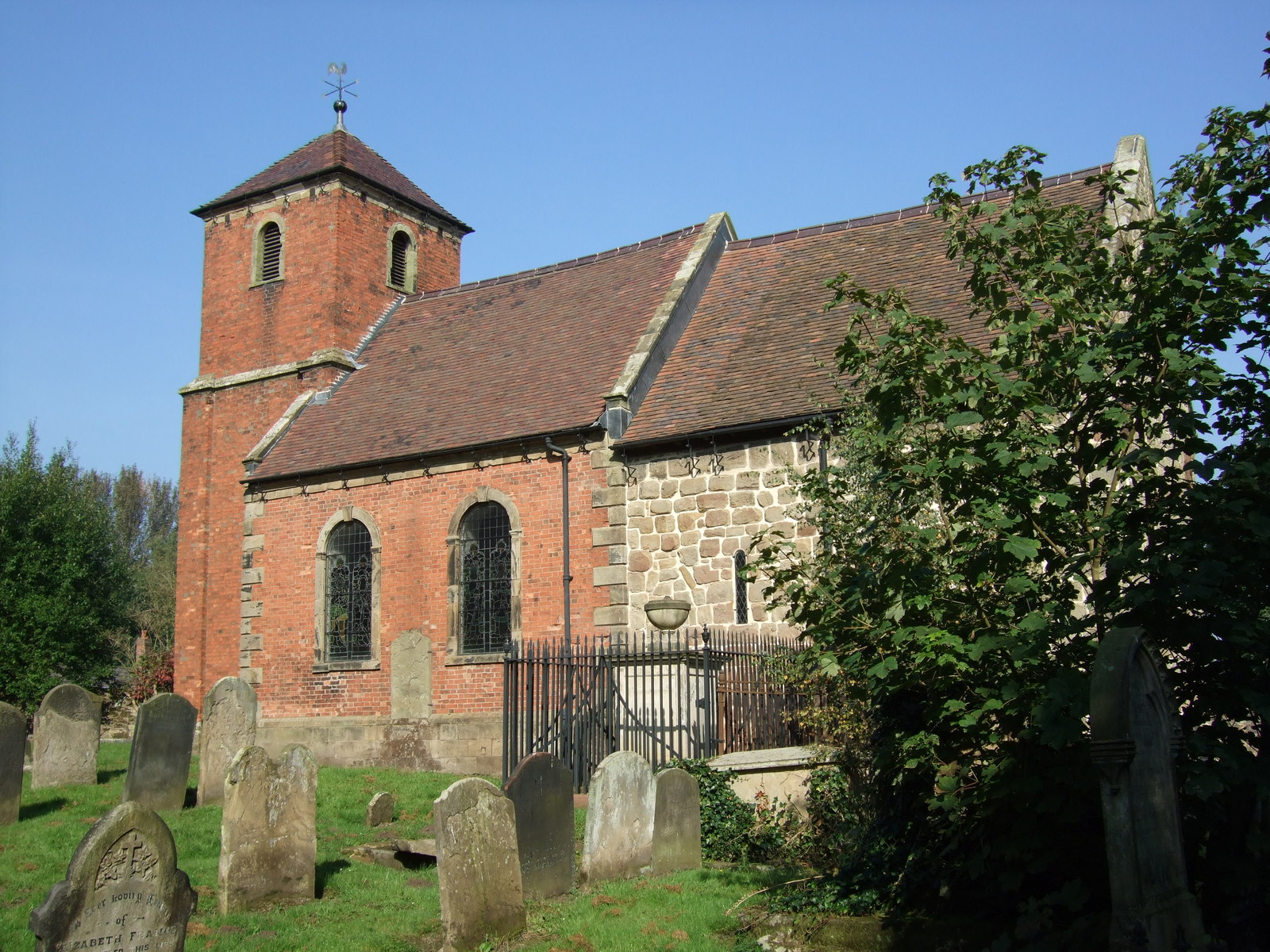
- St James, Stirchley

- Location within Shropshire
- Area: 3.289 km^{2} (1.270 sq mi)
- Population: 10,446 (2021 census)
  - Density: 3,176/km^{2} (8,230/sq mi)
- Civil parish: Stirchley and Brookside
- Unitary authority: Telford and Wrekin
- Ceremonial county: Shropshire
- Region: West Midlands
- Country: England
- Sovereign state: United Kingdom
- Police: West Mercia
- Fire: Shropshire
- Ambulance: West Midlands

Stirchley and Brookside is a civil parish in the Telford and Wrekin unitary authority area of the ceremonial county of Shropshire, England. The parish lies to the south of central Telford, and includes the settlements of Stirchley and Brookside. In 2021 the parish had a population of 10,446. The parish was formed on 1 April 1988.

It has a parish council, the lowest level of local government in England. This is made up of seven councillors for Stirchley ward, five councillors for Brookside ward, and one for Holmer Lake ward.

There is one grade I listed building in the parish, the redundant 12th-century St James' Church, Stirchley. As of 2024 there are four other listed buildings in the parish, all at grade II.

== See also ==
- Listed buildings in Stirchley and Brookside
