= Listed buildings in Hopton Wafers =

Hopton Wafers is a civil parish in Shropshire, England. It contains 26 listed buildings that are recorded in the National Heritage List for England. Of these, three are at Grade II*, the middle of the three grades, and the others are at Grade II, the lowest grade. The parish contains the village of Hopton Wafers, the smaller settlement of Doddington, and the surrounding countryside. The listed buildings include houses and farmhouses, some of which are timber framed, two churches, memorials and tombs in a churchyard, a country house and associated structures, two bridges, and a war memorial.

== Key ==
| Grade | Criteria |
|---|---|
| II* | Particularly important buildings of more than special interest |
| II | Buildings of national importance and special interest |

== Buildings ==
| Name and location | Photograph | Date | Notes | Grade |
|---|---|---|---|---|
| Catherton Cottage; 52.40235°N 2.51097°W | — | Late 15th century | The house is partly timber framed with cruck construction and brick infill, and partly in stone, and has tiled roofs. There is one storey, attics and a cellar, and a four-bay range with end extensions. On the west front are gabled and lean-to extensions and a bay window. The east front contains casement windows and a gabled dormer. Inside are full cruck trusses. | II* |
| Manor Cottage; 52.38529°N 2.53386°W | | 16th century | A timber framed house with rendered infill on a brick plinth, and with a tile roof. There are two storeys, two bays, and a rear wing. The upper floor is jettied with a moulded bressumer, and the windows are casements. | II |
| 1 and 2 Hopton Wafers; 52.38535°N 2.53376°W | — | 17th century | Formerly three houses, later combined into one, later it was extended. The original three bays are timber framed and encased in brick, the one-bay extension to the right is in stone, and the roof is tiled. There is one storey and attics, the windows are casements, and there are three gabled dormers on the front and a flat-roofed dormer at the rear. | II |
| Shote Farmhouse; 52.38637°N 2.54458°W | — | 17th century | The farmhouse is timber framed with brick infill on a stone plinth, with underbuilding in brick and a tile roof. There are two storeys and a cellar, and a T-shaped plan, consisting of a two-bay range and a two-bay cross-wing. On the cross-wing is a projecting porch with a hipped roof, and the windows are casements. | II |
| The Village; 52.38523°N 2.53392°W | | 17th century | A timber framed house encased in stone with a tile roof. There are two storeys, three bays, a brick wing projecting to the right with a dentil eaves course, and a rear lean-to. The windows are casements. | II |
| Catherton; 52.40274°N 2.51043°W | — | 18th century | A farmhouse, later a private house, it is in red brick with a storey band, the rear wings are in stone, and the roof is tiled with coped gables. There are two storeys, five bays, and at the rear are two gabled wings and a lean-to. On the front is a two-storey projecting porch with a hipped roof and a segmental-headed entrance. The windows on the front are mullioned and transomed, and elsewhere they are casements. | II |
| Taylor memorial 52.38579°N 2.53401°W | — | Mid 18th century | The memorial is in the churchyard of St Michael's Church, and is to the memory of Catherine Taylor. It is a headstone in sandstone, and consists of a rectangular slab with a plain inscribed panel and a carved upper edge with a central pediment. | II |
| Waddington memorial 52.38572°N 2.53403°W | — | Mid 18th century | The memorial is in the churchyard of St Michael's Church, and is to the memory of Joyce Waddington and her daughter. It is a headstone in sandstone, and consists of a rectangular slab with a plain inscribed panel and a carved upper edge with a central pediment. | II |
| Hopton Court; 52.38567°N 2.52924°W | — | 1770 | A country house, it was remodelled in 1811–13 by John Nash for Thomas Botfield. The house is faced in ashlar stone, and has a hipped slate roof. There are three storeys, the southwest front has five bays, a central portico of eight paired unfluted Ionic columns with a balustrade. The northwest front has three bays, and two canted bay windows. On the southeast front are bay windows and a portico with four columns and a balustrade. There is a two-storey service wing to the right. | II |
| The Manor; 52.38501°N 2.53418°W | | Late 18th century | A brick house with a dentil eaves course and a hipped tile roof. There are three storeys and three bays, the middle bay with a pediment, and at the rear are two and three-storey gabled wings. In the centre is a doorway with Tuscan columns, an open pediment, and a fanlight. Most of the windows are sashes, those in the middle floor with projecting keyblocks. | II |
| Outbuildings, The Manor; 52.38516°N 2.53403°W | | Late 18th century | Originally farm buildings, they have been altered for residential use, and stretch along the road to the north of the house. The buildings are in brick on a stone plinth, and have a dentil eaves course and tile roofs. There are two storeys, five bays, and a rear cross-wing. The front range contains a carriage entry, most of the windows are casements, with some sashes, and there is a 20th-century oriel window above the entry. | II |
| Hopton Court Bridge; 52.38692°N 2.53138°W | | Late 18th to early 19th century | The bridge carries a road over Hopton Brook. It consists of a single round brick arch on stone abutments with brick buttresses. The bridge has two string courses and a parapet, and the approach walls are splayed. | II |
| Orangery, wall and outbuildings 52.38580°N 2.52759°W | — | c. 1820 | The orangery, wall and outbuildings are in the grounds of Hopton Court. The orangery is built in cast iron and glass, and has stone piers at the doorway and the corners. It has a rectangular plan and nine bays, and is built against a tall brick heated wall. | II* |
| St Michael's Church; 52.38570°N 2.53428°W | | 1825–27 | The church was built for Thomas Botfield on the site of a medieval church. It is in sandstone with a slate roof, and consists of a nave, a south porch, a chancel, and a west tower. The tower has three stages, and contains round-headed windows, a clock face on the south side, and a parapet with pointed battlements and obelisk pinnacles. The windows in the body of the church have pointed heads and contain Perpendicular tracery, and the porch is in Tudor style. | II* |
| Gates, gatepiers and wall, St Michael's Church; 52.38537°N 2.53409°W | — | Early 19th century | The gate piers flank the entrance to the churchyard. They are in sandstone, and each has a square plan, a plinth, a rusticated shaft, a plain entablature, a cornice, and a pyramidal cap. Between them are cast iron gates and an elliptical overthrow. The churchyard wall extends for 40 metres (130 ft) to the northeast. | II |
| 9 Doddington and cowshed 52.38548°N 2.56283°W | — | Early 19th century | A squatter's cottage and attached cowshed, it is in dhustone with a tile roof. The cottage has two storeys, one bay, and a rear wing, and it contains casement windows. Attached is a single-storey cowshed with a corrugated sheet roof, and containing two doorways. | II |
| Hopton Bridge; 52.38269°N 2.53265°W | | Early 19th century | The bridge carries the A4117 road over Hopton Brook. It is in sandstone, and consists of a single round arch with a span of 5 metres (16 ft) set on an abutment. The bridge has voussoirs, a string course, arched buttresses at the sides, and parapets with round coping and ending in round piers. | II |
| Little Cottage; 52.38541°N 2.53360°W | — | Early 19th century | The house was extended in the 20th century. It is in red brick with some stone and a tile roof. The gable end faces the road, there is one storey and an attic, and an extension bay at the rear. The windows are casements, and there is a dormer on the west side. | II |
| Nicholls memorial and railings 52.38562°N 2.53432°W | — | Early 19th century | The memorial is in the churchyard of St Michael's Church, and is to the memory of Drusilla Nicholls. It is in sandstone and consists of a pedestal tomb, with a two-stage plinth, panels with incised borders, a moulded cornice, and a pyramidal lid with an urn finial. The tomb is surrounded by iron railings. | II |
| Nott and Cooksey memorial and railings 52.38557°N 2.53443°W | — | Early 19th century | The memorial is in the churchyard of St Michael's Church, and is to the memory of Lucy Nott and Charles Cooksey. It is in sandstone and consists of a pedestal tomb, with a moulded chamfered plinth, plain raised panels, a moulded cornice, and a curved pyramidal lied with a tabernacle finial. The tomb is surrounded by iron railings. | II |
| Outbuilding and courtyard walls 52.38644°N 2.52852°W | — | Early 19th century | Originally stables in the grounds of Hopton Court, the outbuildings are rendered with hipped slate roofs. They form a courtyard plan, with a two-storey four-bay block flanked by single-storey wings. Most of the windows are sashes. The cobbled courtyard is enclosed by rendered walls with stone coping, and square gate piers with pyramidal caps. | II |
| The Iron House; 52.38622°N 2.53354°W | — | Early 19th century | A sandstone house with some red brick dressings and a tile roof. Under the tiles is a roof consisting of iron plates, designed by Thomas Botfield. There are two storeys, and two bays, the windows are casements, and there is a blocked doorway with a segmental arch. At the rear in a 20th-century extension, larger than the original house. | II |
| St John's Church, Doddington; 52.38221°N 2.56631°W | | 1849 | A stone church, consisting of a nave, a south porch, a chancel, and a west tower. The tower contains round-headed windows, a clock face on the south side, and an embattled parapet with raised corner merlons. The windows in the body of the church have pointed heads, and the porch has buttresses and a semi-embattled parapet. | II |
| Tomb of Thomas Botfield; 52.38541°N 2.53444°W | | Mid 19th century | The tomb is in the churchyard of St Michael's Church, and is to the memory of Thomas Botfield and his wife. It is in sandstone, and consists of a sarcophagus-style memorial on a stone-clad square brick tomb. The sarcophagus has a pyramidal lid with a ball-flower finial, inclined sides with a simple incised border, and lions' feet on a plain plinth. The tomb has corniced eaves, panels with pilaster shafts, one of which has an inscription, all on a plain plinth. | II |
| Doddington War Memorial; 52.38206°N 2.56598°W | — | 1921 | The war memorial is in the churchyard of St John's Church. It is in limestone, and consists of a wheel head cross with a tapering shaft, on a tapering plinth on a base of two steps. On the plinth is an inscription and the names of those lost in the First World War. | II |
