= Stirchley =

Stirchley may refer to:

- Stirchley, Shropshire, one of the constituents of Telford
- Stirchley, West Midlands, an area in south Birmingham
