= Telford Park School =

The Telford Park School

Location
- District Centre; Stirchley, Shropshire; Telford, Shropshire, TF3 1FA; England; 52.6556°N 2.4347°W

Information
- Type: Academy
- Motto: “Ready, Resilient, Responsible and Safe”
- Established: 1976
- Local authority: Telford and Wrekin Council
- Trust: Amethyst Academies
- Department for Education URN: 150716 Tables
- Ofsted: Reports
- Headteacher: Aimee Huntington
- Staff: 80+
- Gender: mixed
- Age: 11 to 16
- Enrolment: 800+
- Houses: 3
- Colours: Black and gold
- Website: www.telfordparkschool.co.uk

The Telford Park School is a coeducational secondary school located in Stirchley, Telford, Shropshire, England. The school grounds was first established in 1976 under the name of Stirchley Upper School, then renamed The Lord Silkin School, then later renamed Lakeside Academy. The original school was demolished in 2015 and rebuilt as The Telford Park School.

== History ==
=== Diary ===
In April 2004, The Lord Silkin School was the subject of the "Secret Diary of a School Teacher", an article published in British satirical magazine, Private Eye. The article had been written, over the course of a week, by an anonymous maths teacher at the school. It described general pupil misbehaviour and lack of achievement in the school. The diary described an undercurrent of pupil misbehaviour and incompetence in the school, including girls who were sexually active before they could do simple sums, students who asserted that they had rights if any attempt were made to punish them, and a pervasive attitude of indifference. The diary, presented in a special pull-out section of the magazine, drew widespread messages of support and confirmation of the problem, which were printed in the following issue. The messages came not only from teachers, but from pupils too.

In the Shropshire Star, it was revealed that the teacher was from Telford, although he wanted to remain anonymous to protect the children at the school. Within weeks, the teacher's identity, Stuart Williams, was discovered by the UK press, with stories in the Sunday People and the Daily Mail, and the school was identified as Lord Silkin School. He was subsequently interviewed by the Sunday Telegraph and Radio Shropshire.

=== Name changes ===
On 1 April 2013 The Lord Silkin School converted to academy status and was renamed "Lakeside Academy". The school became part of the Telford Co-operative Multi-Academy Trust. The New Academy also came in with a change of uniform, that went into place September 2012.

In April 2015, the school failed its Ofsted inspection, and was placed in special measures. Starting in September 2015, the school had a new academy sponsor, the Community Academies Trust, and was renamed "Telford Park School".

The new school buildings (which were started in mid-2013) were opened in September 2015. They include a sports centre and a post 16 centre. The old building was demolished in 2015 after the opening of the new Telford Park School.

== Trust Changes ==
Following the 24 May 2022 Ofsted inspection, the school once again changed trusts, effective January 2024, to Amethyst Academies Trust. The trust imposed new rules to bring the school back up to standards.

== Sport & Leisure ==
Telford Park has a range of sports facilities used by the public, students and staff. A sports hall is located in the school, used during physical education lessons and sports events. The school also contains a gym, available to students and staff throughout the day and open to the public after school hours. The school also has an outdoor concrete MUGA for use of students during breaks.

Like many schools in the area, Telford Park organises teams to allow students to represent the school at certain sports events. These often include football teams, rugby teams and athletics teams.

== Anti-bullying policy ==
Following the April 2014 death at his residence of a 12-year-old pupil whose parents alleged that he had been the victim of bullying, the school stated that it had "an anti-bullying policy which includes generic sections for both staff and students [with] the section for students put together by the students themselves", and further stated that there are well established procedures for supporting young people at the school."

== Weekend education ==
The Telford Japanese School (テルフォード補習授業校 Terufōdo Hoshū Jugyō Kō), a weekend Japanese educational programme, is held at Telford Park School.

== Notable former pupils ==
- Nicholas Archibald - cricketer
