= Stirchley Chimney =

Chimney located in Telford Town Park

Coordinates: 52°39′50″N 2°26′40″W

Stirchley Chimney is a chimney located in Telford Town Park. The chimney also marks a notable waypoint on the South Telford Heritage Trail. Measuring 209 feet (64 m) high, construction of the chimney was completed in 1873.

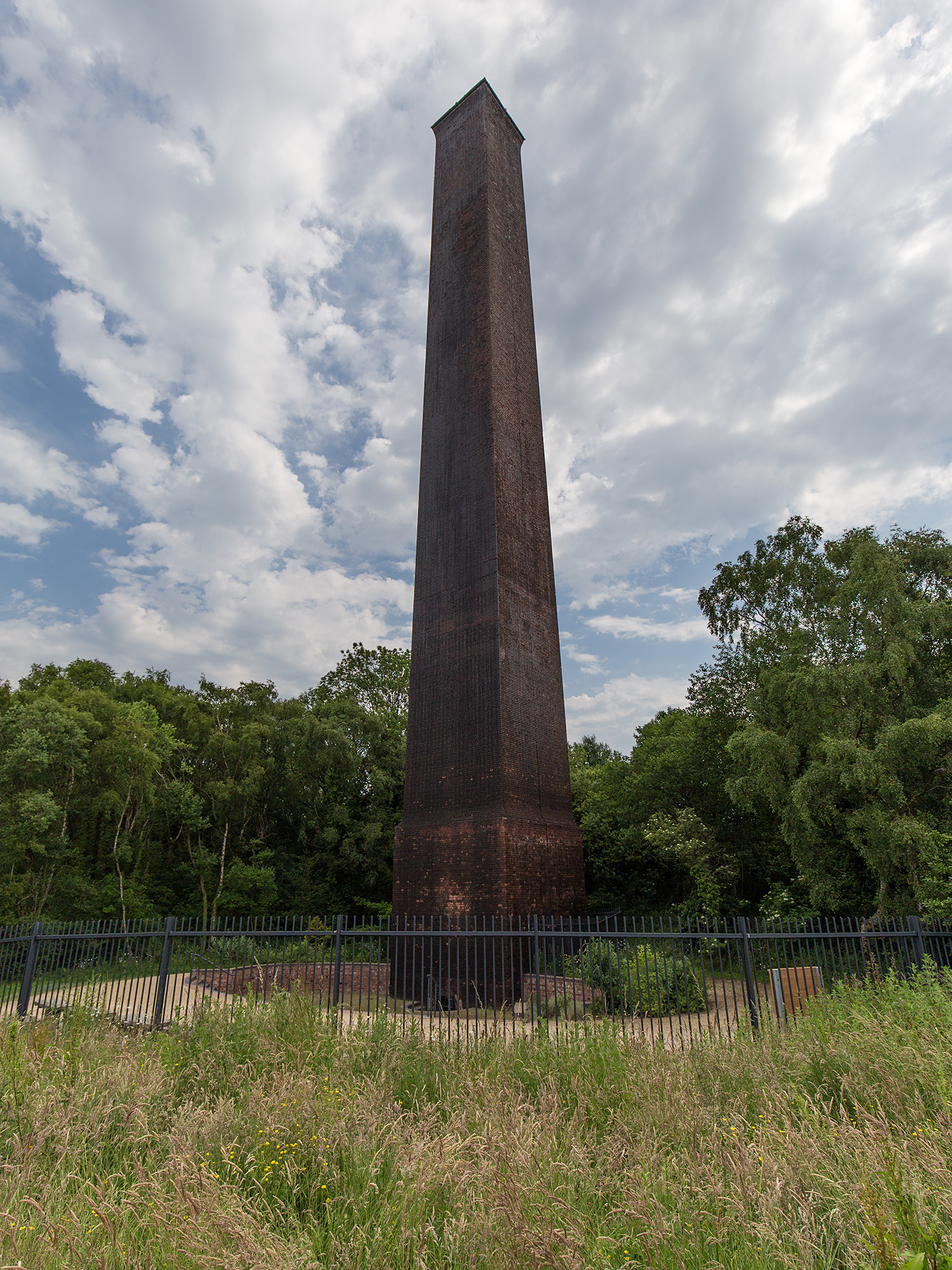
Stirchley Chimney pictured in 2015

== History ==
In 1790 Thomas Botfield began the construction of an ironworks on the site, consisting of two blast furnaces, a forge, and a mill. The site was opened in 1828 and later expanded in order to produce bricks in 1838.

In 1856, control of the site was granted to the Old Park Iron Company. Following the demise of the Old Park Iron Company, the blast furnaces were leased to the Wellington Iron & Coal Company, yet the company folded shortly after in 1877. It was during this tenure that the Stirchley Chimney was constructed. The blast furnaces continued to operate until 1885 until they were taken over by Wrekin Chemical Works in 1886, when the plant was converted in order to produce tar, sulphur, lime salt, wood naphtha and charcoal. Production at the site ceased in 1932. From 1923 until 1935 the Tarslag company purchased the slag mounds surrounding the chimney in order to use the refuse for the purpose of road building. The Tarmac company continued to remove slag from the site until 1964.

== Recent restoration ==
The creation of Telford in 1969 led to the purchase of the site by the New Town Development Corporation.The decision was made to retain the Stirchley Chimney as a permanent reminder of the industry which once dominated the area.

The chimney and the area around it was recently refurbished following years of neglect. The chimney now boasts information boards explaining its history to visitors.

In 2020 work began to repoint the chimney with lime mortar. Work was suspended as a result of the UK Coronavirus lockdown. When the repointing resumed in May 2020 it was discovered that the chimney had become home to a nest of kestrels.
