= Stirchley, Shropshire =

Village in Shropshire, England

Coordinates: 52.6547°N 2.4351°W

Stirchley
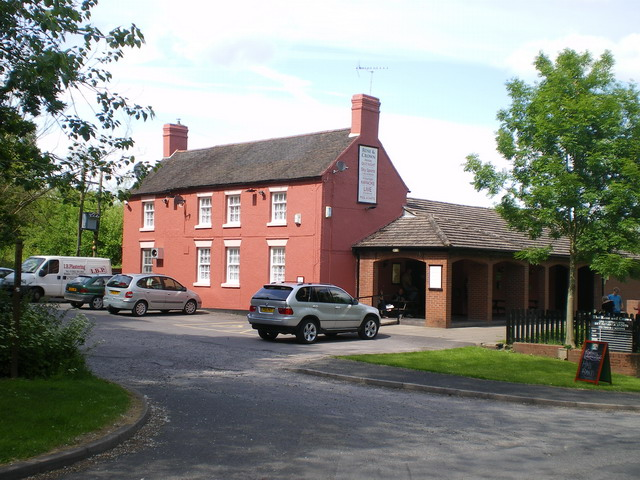
- The Rose and Crown, Stirchley

- Location within Shropshire
- Population: 10,555
- OS grid reference: SJ 7067106422
- Civil parish: Stirchley and Brookside
- Unitary authority: Telford and Wrekin
- Ceremonial county: Shropshire
- Region: West Midlands
- Country: England
- Sovereign state: United Kingdom
- Post town: TELFORD
- Postcode district: TF3
- Dialling code: 01952
- Police: West Mercia
- Fire: Shropshire
- Ambulance: West Midlands
- UK Parliament: Telford; The Wrekin

Stirchley is a large village and suburb of Telford, in the borough of Telford and Wrekin and ceremonial county of Shropshire, England. Stirchley lies just south-east of the town centre, and shares a parish council with neighbouring Brookside, which together have a population of 10,533 according to the 2001 census data It is close to Dawley and Malinslee and located next to the southern side of Telford town park. Although formerly a farming parish, it was incorporated into the Telford New Town in the 1970s. There are some important heritage sites in the parish, notably St James Church, Stirchley Hall, Stirchley Grange and the Stirchley Chimney, now a local landmark. A number of Stirchley's heritage sites are waypoints on the South Telford Heritage Trail. The former school was removed brick-by-brick and rebuilt at the nearby Blists Hill Victorian Town museum in 1993.

== History ==
=== Growth of the settlement ===
One of the most common historical units of administration between the 11th to mid-19th century were called hundreds (also known as wapentakes), and these were useful to reveal regional differences on a national scale over a large time period. Stirchley is part of South Bradford hundred in the district of Wellington.

Stirchley was a small community based on agriculture. In 1612 the village was initially founded by 3 farms and 5 cottages, but as industry spread at the beginning of the 19th century, the population of the settlement grew to 333 in 1881, where it peaked. The population declined steeply until the 1940s, however not just the population, but the settlement has grown substantially since, particularly as the parish now includes Brookside, which neighbours Stirchley meaning the headcount for the census data is much larger. Until the 19th century, the parish only contained 4 main farmsteads and a small number of cottages nearby the church, but this changed when the population increased and affected the settlement pattern. Due to the industry taking place in the surrounding area houses were converted into cottages for the workers in the collieries and ironworks. Furthermore, after 1821 many more houses were being built including Clerks Row which was built in 1840 to house the ironwork's managers. The increasing size of the settlement led to a licensed ale house, named the Rose and Crown, and a village shop by the early 1840s. John Marius Wilson, Imperial Gazetteer of England and Wales (1870–72) wrote of how Stirchley was a Parish with a population of 310 and had a railway station. Also, 'the property was divided among a few suggesting many people shared houses.

=== Post-1960s ===
In the 1960s the district of Dawley (before it changed in the early 1970s to the district of Telford ), was developed by corporations. In the early 1970s most of the farmsteads in the South East of the district which included Stirchley were destroyed to make room for housing estates for example, 500 private houses were built from 1972 creating the modern village of Stirchley that exists today. Also, on the former sites of two farms 948 dwellings were completed in the late 1970s, and nearby a new church, school and other facilities for recreation were constructed. Stirchley was developed as the population was increasing and there was a demand for more housing, amenities and facilities such as the railway station in nearby Telford in 1986.

The area of Stirchley was a civil parish until 1 April 1966 when it was abolished and merged with Dawley. In May 1988, Stirchley and Brookside Parish Council was formed. Currently there are thirteen active members in the Council which is based in the Sambrook Centre in Stirchley and they together, represent the two areas of Stirchley and Brookside.

=== Boundary changes ===
The boundaries for Stirchley have changed very little over time. The changes that have taken place have been minor along the Eastern side of the Parish. However, there are current proposals being made to reduce the number of parliamentary constituencies in England from 533 to 502, and this will affect the local council or electoral division/ward boundaries of some places. Stirchley is not likely to be changed but could be expanded slightly to compensate for the loss of a constituency.

== Demographics ==
The population of Stirchley, including both males and females

The population of Stirchley has been inconsistent from when the census records began in 1801. In general the population rose until 1851 where there were 302 people living in the Parish, but soon after it declined and by 1891 the population was reduced by as much as 42.1%. From the beginning of the 20th century there were not any large scale demographic variations until the census in 1951 revealed 66 people died, most likely from the first and second World Wars. In 1961 the parish had a population of 107. However, since Stirchley and Brookside combined as one Council Parish, the penultimately recent Census data in 2001 shows a much larger population and it is hard to define how much the population has increased just in the area of Stirchley.

== Occupational structure ==
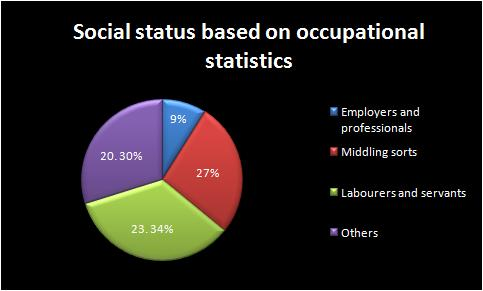
Occupational statistics of Males aged over 20 in Stirchley in 1831

From data in 1831 the majority of males over 20 were involved in either agriculture or manufacturing and the minority in retail and handicrafts. Most people in Stirchley had a social status of labourers, servants, or 'middling sorts' which are small farmers not employing labourers, however there were some employers and professionals. From the 2001 Census, it can be seen that the majority of the population between 16 and 74 in Stirchley are economically active. Many are employed in the Service industries which includes retail, transport, education and social work.

== Places of interest ==
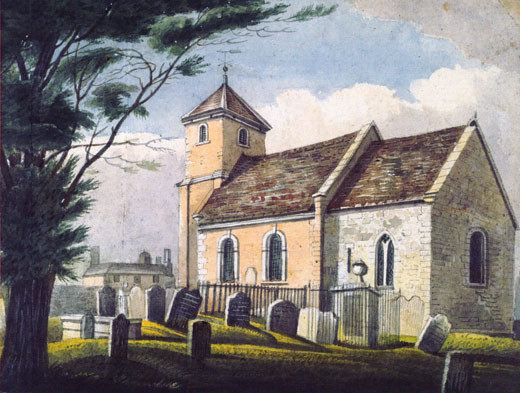
St James church in Stirchley by James Holmes Smith c. 1850

There is one main church in Stirchley, St.James', that is situated in a quiet location one mile away from Telford town centre. In the 12th century the chancel, where the clergy and choir are seated, was built from local sandstone. Today the more recent additions from the 18th century can be seen such as the steeple which was made from red brick.

Stirchley Hall farm is an estate that has been bought by numerous people and the last person known to have ownership of the estate was Thomas Clowes. The last person to buy the estate was Dawley Development Corporation in 1964.

== Education ==
Telford Park School is located in Stirchley.

The Telford Japanese School (テルフォード補習授業校 Terufōdo Hoshū Jugyō Kō), a weekend Japanese educational programme, is held at Telford Park School.

== See also ==
- Listed buildings in Stirchley and Brookside
