= Nicholas Archibald =

Scottish cricketer

Nicholas Bruce Archibald (born 6 December 1975 in Perth, Scotland) is a Scottish former List A cricketer.

He was educated at Lord Silkin School, Telford, Shropshire.

He was a right-handed batsman who played for Shropshire and made a single appearance for Shropshire Under-19s in 1994. His Minor Counties Championship debut was in 1997 and he made a single List A appearance for the combined team in the 2001 C&G Trophy, scoring 3 runs. Most recent achievement was winning the Shropshire 3rd division single-handedly for Broseley.
