= Madeley Wood Company =

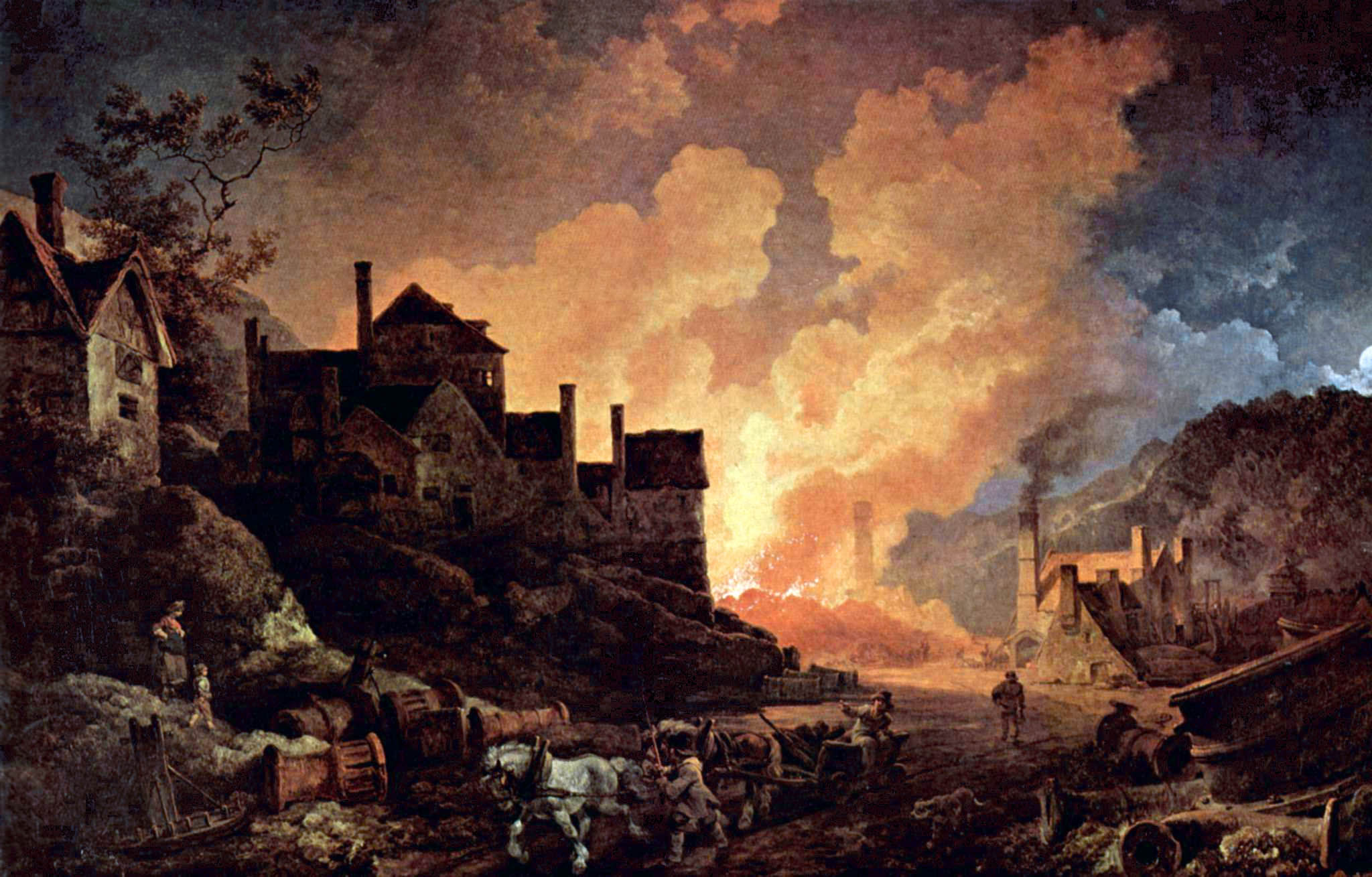
Madeley Wood Furnaces, painted by Philip James de Loutherbourg in 1801 and known as Coalbrookdale at night

The Madeley Wood Company was formed in 1756 when the Madeley Wood Furnaces, also called Bedlam Furnaces, were built beside the River Severn, one mile west of Blists Hill.

== GOG ==
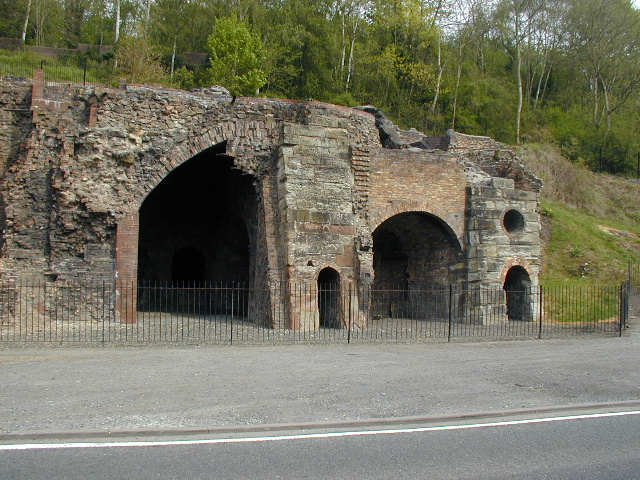
Bedlam Furnaces today

The Madeley Wood Furnaces or Bedlam Furnaces were owned by this company, which held mineral leases in Madeley Parish, enabling it to extract coal and iron ore. The works were taken over by Abraham Darby III of the Coalbrookdale Company in 1776. When the company was reorganised in 1797, the Madeley Wood Works became separate from Coalbrookdale, continuing (in conjunction with the Ketley Ironworks) in the hands of the Reynolds family who had been in partnership with the Darby family at Coalbrookdale since the 1760s. After Joseph Reynolds decided to concentrate on his bank, the Madeley Wood Company works passed to the Anstice family, one of whom had managed it, and their business became another Madeley Wood Company.

The name Bedlam Furnaces may have originated with a painting by John Sell Cotman (1782–1842) who painted the furnace in 1803 and titled it Bedlam Furnace Near Irongate,[sic] Shropshire. He was on tour with a fellow less well known artist called Paul Sandby Munn (1773–1845) who also painted the same subject and titled it Bedlam Furnace, Madeley Dale, Shropshire. It was both a metaphor (the place appeared to the painters to resemble a lunatic asylum), and simultaneously a jest at the expense of Fletcher of Madeley (1729–1785) a then famous Methodist preacher in whose parish the ironworks were located. The furnaces were also painted, under the same name, by the painter Edward Dayes (d. 1804) at around the same time. This work is now part of the Tate Gallery.

The site history through the 20th century is less well documented. Dense vegetation cover was allowed to establish itself amongst the ruins until the late 1950s when the site was subject to spoil dumping, which completely buried the furnace bases. In the 1970s what was to become the Ironbridge Gorge Museum Trust began clearing and restoring the works.

== Blists Hill ==
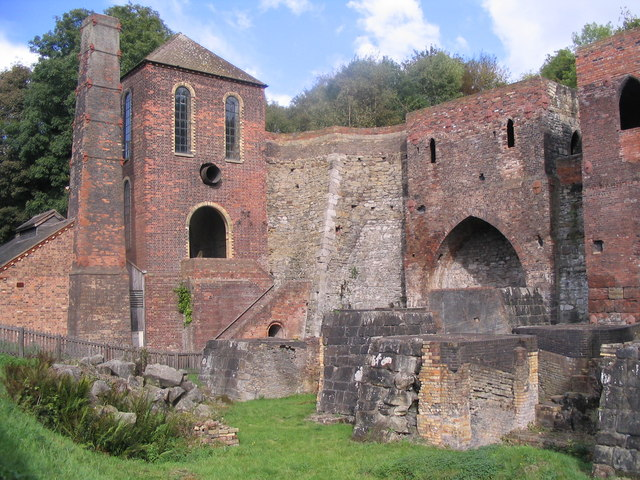
Blowing engine house and blast furnaces at Blists Hill

Upon its opening in 1790, the ironworks had access to the Shropshire Canal, the Blists Hill section of which ran immediately to the east of the Blists Hill works site. Proximity of raw materials and the means of transporting the finished product persuaded the company to build a blast furnace at Blists Hill in 1832.

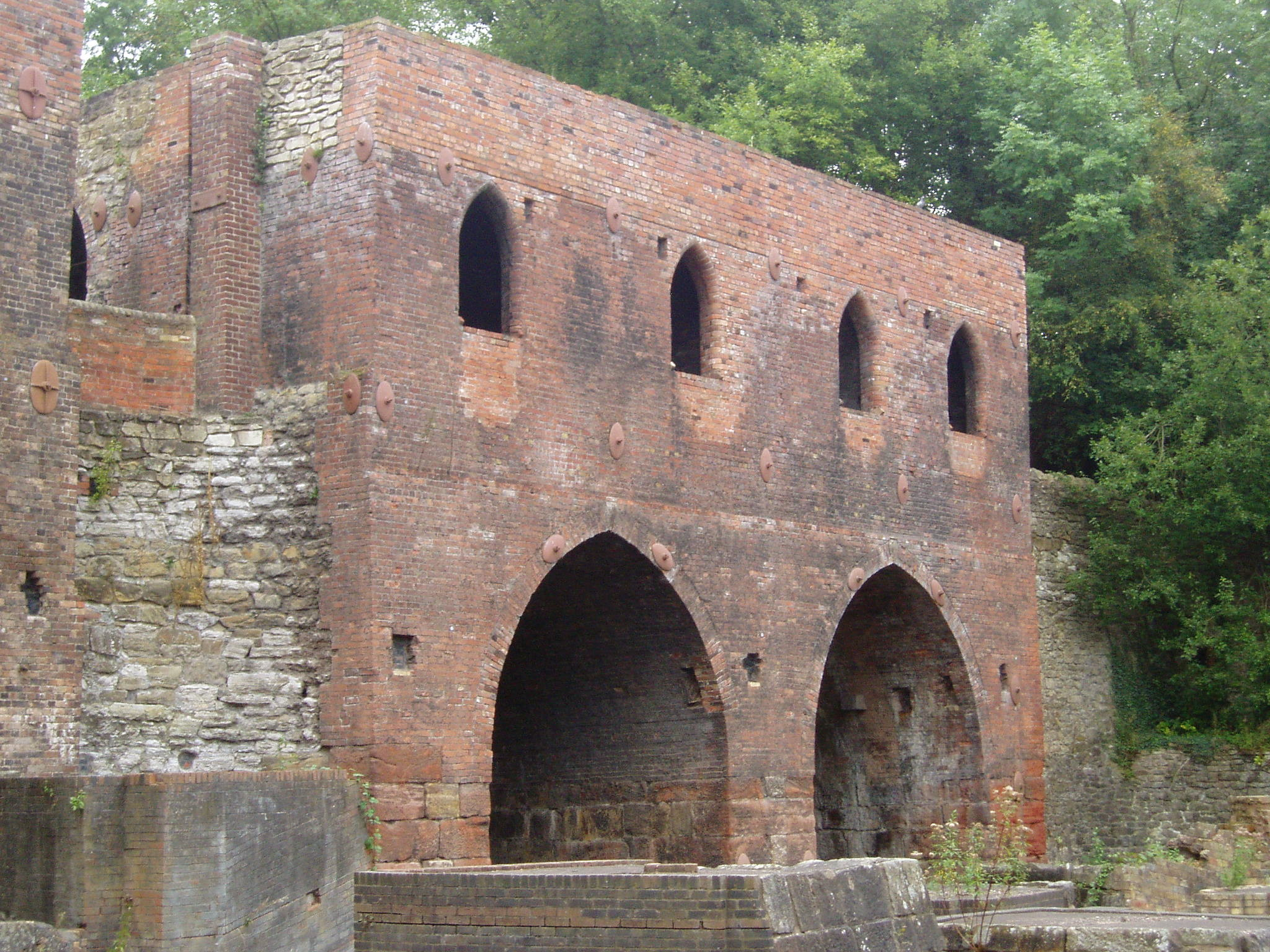
The original blast furnaces at Blists Hill, Madeley

Additional furnaces were added in 1840 and 1844, making a total of three, and the site remained active in the production of pig iron until 1912 when the ironworks ceased production, following the blowing in of two of the furnaces.

The furnace settings and blowing houses are now preserved, but unrestored, as part of the Blists Hill Victorian Town, one of the Ironbridge Gorge Museums.
