= Telford steam tram =

Heritage railway in Shropshire, England

Coordinates: 52.662272°N 2.483051°W

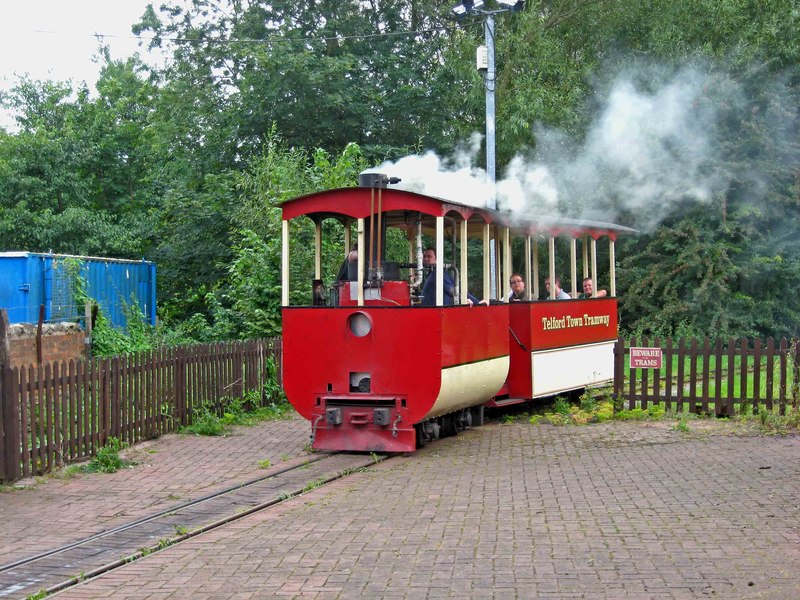
- Locale: Horsehay, Shropshire, England

Commercial operations
- Original gauge: 2 ft (610 mm)

Preserved operations
- Operated by: Telford Horsehay Steam Trust
- Stations: 2
- Preserved gauge: 2 ft (610 mm)

Commercial history
- Opened: 9 April 1980
- Closed: mid-1980s (at Telford Town Park)
- Re-opened: 27 September 1992, Tram steams for the 1st time in preservation

The Telford steam tram at the Telford Steam Railway of the Telford Horsehay Steam Trust, runs on a 2 ft (610 mm) narrow gauge track. This follows a short circular route, part of which runs near to the lake known as Horsehay Pool.

The tram and 16-seat coach were built by Alan Keef Ltd for the Telford Development Corporation, first running on Saturday 8 September 1979. The tram and coach originally ran in Telford Town Park alongside Randlay Pool, on about 300 yd (270 m) of the trackbed of the former Coalport Branch Line, on the Telford Town Tramway which was opened by the Reverend W. Awdry, who named the tram Thomas, on 9 April 1980 but did not last very long there. The tram moved to its present site in 1988 and opened on 27 September 1992 at Horsehay.

Steam trams were common in the last years of the 19th century and the early years of the 20th century, being used in several towns and cities in the UK. Most were eventually replaced by electric trams. The steam tram at the Telford Steam Railway is one of the very few working examples, and possibly the only narrow gauge tram engine in the UK. It is 4-wheeled and Pontie Steam Plant Ltd of Peterborough built its vertical boiler and 5 1/4 in (130 mm) x 10 in (250 mm) cylinders.
