= Blists Hill Victorian Town =

Open-air museum in Shropshire, England

Coordinates: 52.629°N 2.451°W

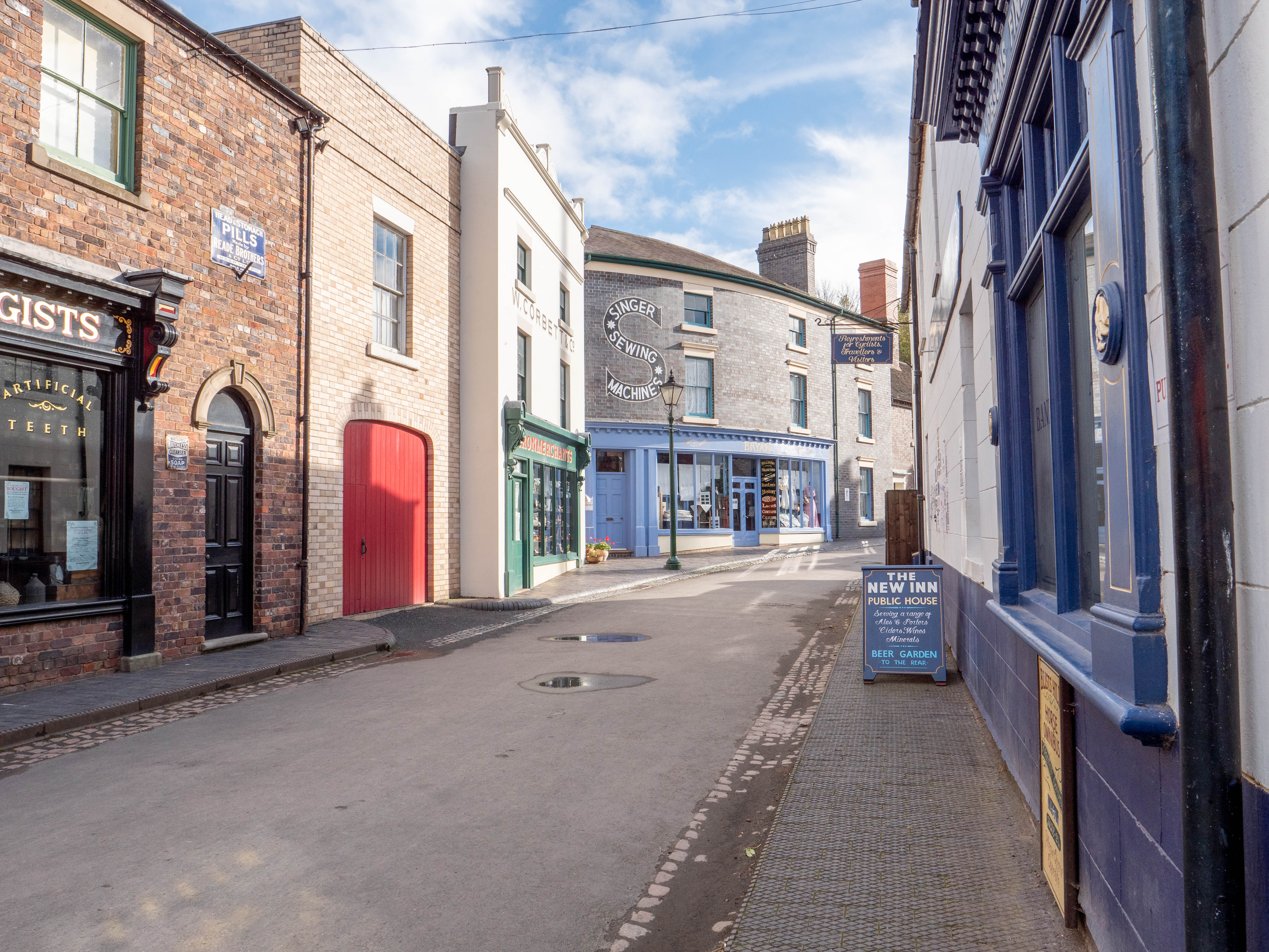
Blists Hill Victorian Town

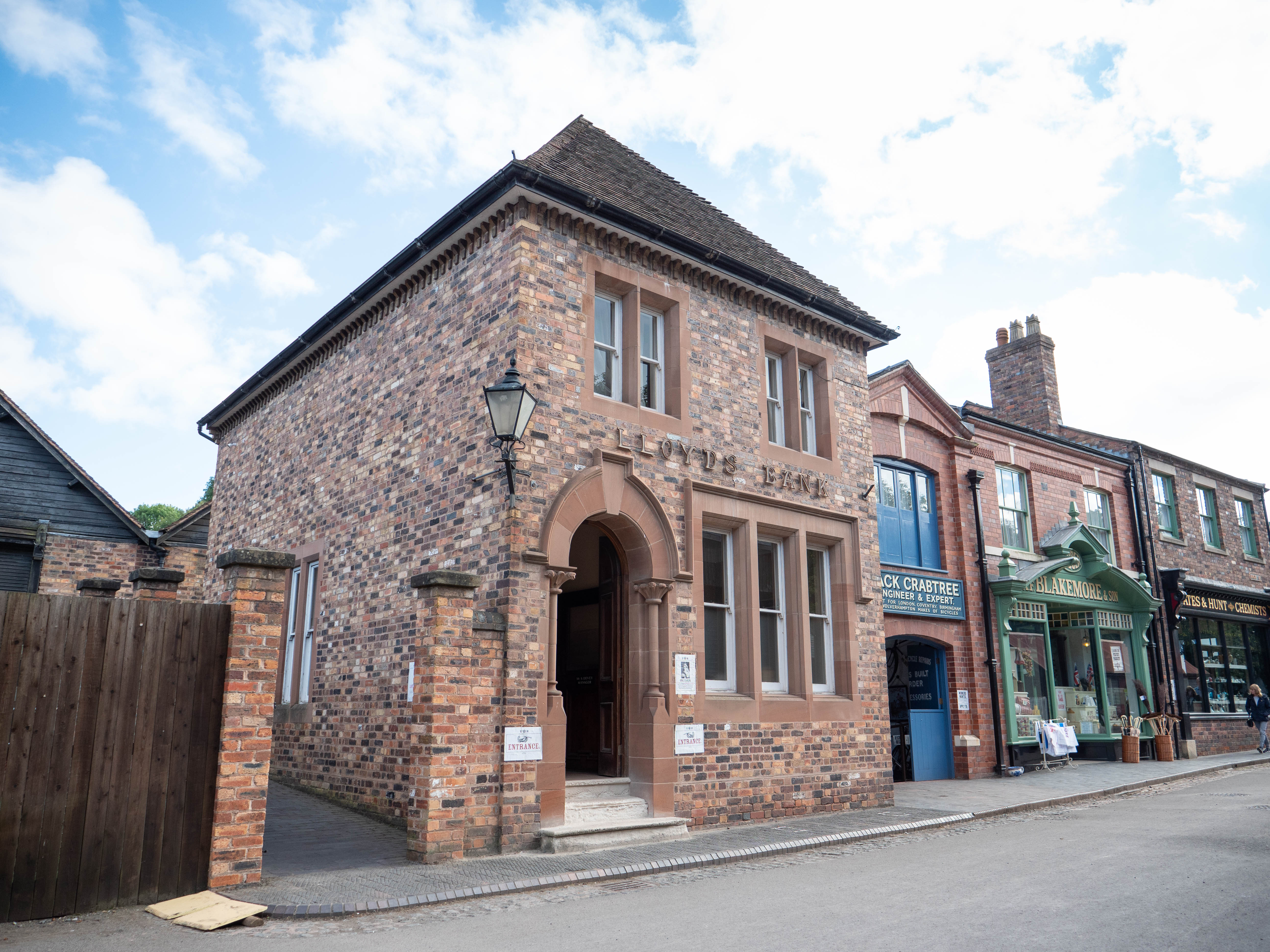
The Lloyds Bank at Blists Hill Victorian Town

Blists Hill Victorian Town is an open-air museum built on a former industrial complex located in Madeley, Telford and Wrekin, Shropshire, England. The museum attempts to recreate the sights, sounds and smells of a Victorian Shropshire town in the late 19th and early 20th centuries. It is managed by the National Trust and is one of ten museums acquired from the Ironbridge Gorge Museum Trust in 2026.

Originally Blists Hill was an industrial region consisting of a brick and tile works, blast furnaces and coal, iron and fire clay mines. The museum was opened in 1973 and has been growing ever since. The museum's buildings fall into one of three categories, buildings that were already part of the industrial site, buildings that represent a generic type and original buildings that have been relocated to the museum.

The museum has three districts, a town area with Victorian era shops such as a bank, bakery, bicycle shop and post office. An industrial district that provided various employment from a blast furnace and wrought iron works and a countryside district with buildings such as a squatter's cottage and tin roof church. The museum has been used as a venue for various television programmes and films, including Doctor Who and Blue Peter.

== History of the site ==
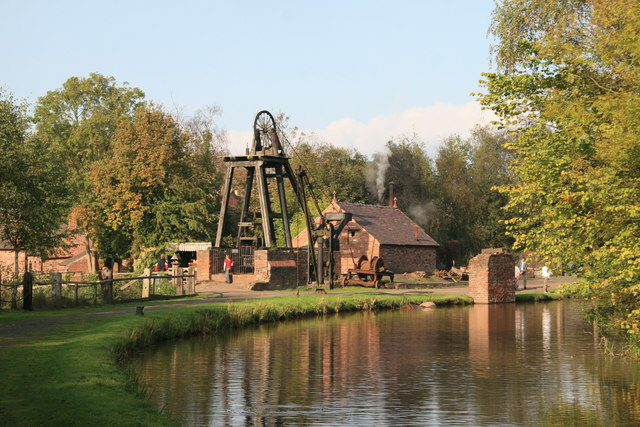
The coal mine and Shropshire Canal

In the 18th and 19th centuries, Blists Hill was an industrial region consisting of a brick and tile works, blast furnaces and coal, iron and fire clay mines operated by the Madeley Wood Company. A short section of the Shropshire Canal ran across the site to the Hay Inclined Plane, which transported boats up and down the 207 ft (63 m) tall incline from Blists Hill to Coalport.

== Open-air museum ==
=== Introduction ===
Blists Hill Victorian Town, originally called Blists Hill Open Air Museum, was opened in 1973, and has been slowly growing ever since. The museum's buildings fall into one of three categories: buildings that were already part of the industrial site (e.g. the brickworks); buildings that simply represent a generic type (e.g. the sweet shop), some adaptively reusing existing premises on site or being replicas of those still standing elsewhere; and original buildings that have been relocated to the museum (e.g. The New Inn public house, which originally stood between Green Lane and Hospital Street in Walsall).

Many buildings are staffed by one or more costumed demonstrators, who have been trained in the skills and history of the profession they re-enact. For example, in the printshop, visitors can watch posters and newssheets being printed. The demonstrators normally talk in the third person, referring to the Victorians as "they" or "them" (rather than in the first person "I" or "we" which some similar museums employ): the museum management believes that this allows greater scope for comparing modern techniques with those re-enacted at the museum. Staff may also be seen performing such diverse tasks as operating stationary steam engines, iron founding and mucking out pigs.

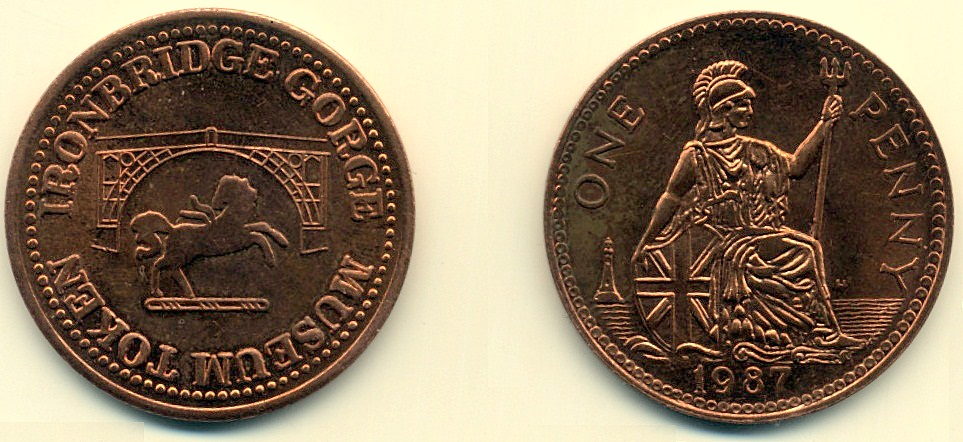
A Penny token as used in Blists Hill

The first building visitors see in the museum is the bank (modelled on the still-standing Lloyds Bank branch in Broseley), at which under the IGMT's tenure they could change modern coinage into token coinage representing the predecimal farthings, halfpennies, pennies, threepenny bits and sixpences, at an exchange rate of 40 new pence to 1 old penny. They could then use the token coins as an alternative to modern currency for buying goods whilst visiting the museum (the gift shop at the museum entrance operated only in modern currency).

=== Town area ===
The High Street area of the Upper Town has been developed around a London and North Western Railway interchange siding with a plateway which is an original feature of the site. Shops erected on the site include a chemist (with fittings from Bournemouth), butcher (from Ironbridge), grocer (replica of a building from Oakengates), and printer (building from Ironbridge, with equipment from Kington, Herefordshire). Small crafts include an iron foundry, a shoeing smith, bootmaker, locksmith, decorative plasterer (with equipment from Burton upon Trent), builder, and sawmill.

Premises in Quarry Bank include a tallow candle manufactory (from Madeley), a bakery (from Dawley), a physician's surgery (in a Sutherland Estate cottage from Donnington), and a Board School (from Stirchley).

New developments over the late 2000s and early 2010s included the addition of 'Canal Street', which was a new build closely modelled on extant and historic buildings in the Telford area. This area includes a new Fish and Chip Shop, Drapers shop and Post Office, as well as an enlarged Sweet Shop. A walkway is located at the end of Canal Street, which leads visitors to the ruins of the brick and tile works. Adjacent to the ruins, and on select days, an operational replica of a steam locomotive designed and built by Richard Trevithick in 1802 runs on a short segment of 3 ft (914 mm) narrow gauge track. The original locomotive was the world's first steam locomotive on rails and was commissioned by the Coalbrookdale Company, which was located nearby (however, no record exists of this locomotive ever being successfully run). In 2015, the Trevithick Shed was built to house the locomotive when not in use.

=== Ironworks area ===
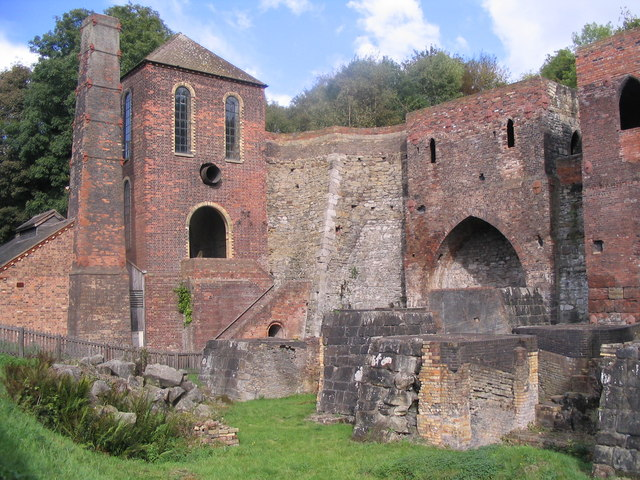
Blowing engine house and blast furnaces at Blists Hill

The original Madeley Wood Company blast furnaces produced pig iron from 1832 to 1911. Their remains have been conserved and a blowing engine from the Lilleshall Company's Priorslee Ironworks installed in one of the houses. Nearby are displayed a pair of beam engines from the same location, alongside a wrought iron works using equipment from Thomas Walmsley's Atlas Forge in Bolton in an iron-framed building designed by Rennie for Woolwich Dockyard.

=== Countryside area ===
The more remote parts of the site demonstrate natural recolonisation of an industrial landscape. Amongst buildings re-erected in this area are a corrugated iron tin tabernacle, (St Chad's Mission Church from Lodge Bank), a squatter cottage (from Dawley), and a toll house (designed by Telford for the Holyhead Road at Shelton).

=== New developments ===
Since 1998 the last surviving Severn Trow Spry has been on display in a dry berth at the museum. A new protective shed was completed for it in 2015.

In 2009 a £12 million programme of redevelopment was completed which included the previously discussed buildings on Canal Street, a new World Heritage Visitor Centre, a 2 ft (610 mm) narrow gauge Mine Railway, and a 4 ft 8 1/2 in (1,435 mm) standard gauge Inclined Lift supplied by WGH Ltd. The mine railway is intended to represent a 1920s clay mine, although the rolling stock is modern and the mine is formed by a concrete bunker. The inclined lift is entirely modern, and enables visitors with restricted mobility to access the lower part of the site. The project did not fund the restoration of the Scheduled Ancient Monuments and associated archaeological features on the site.

=== Hay inclined plane ===
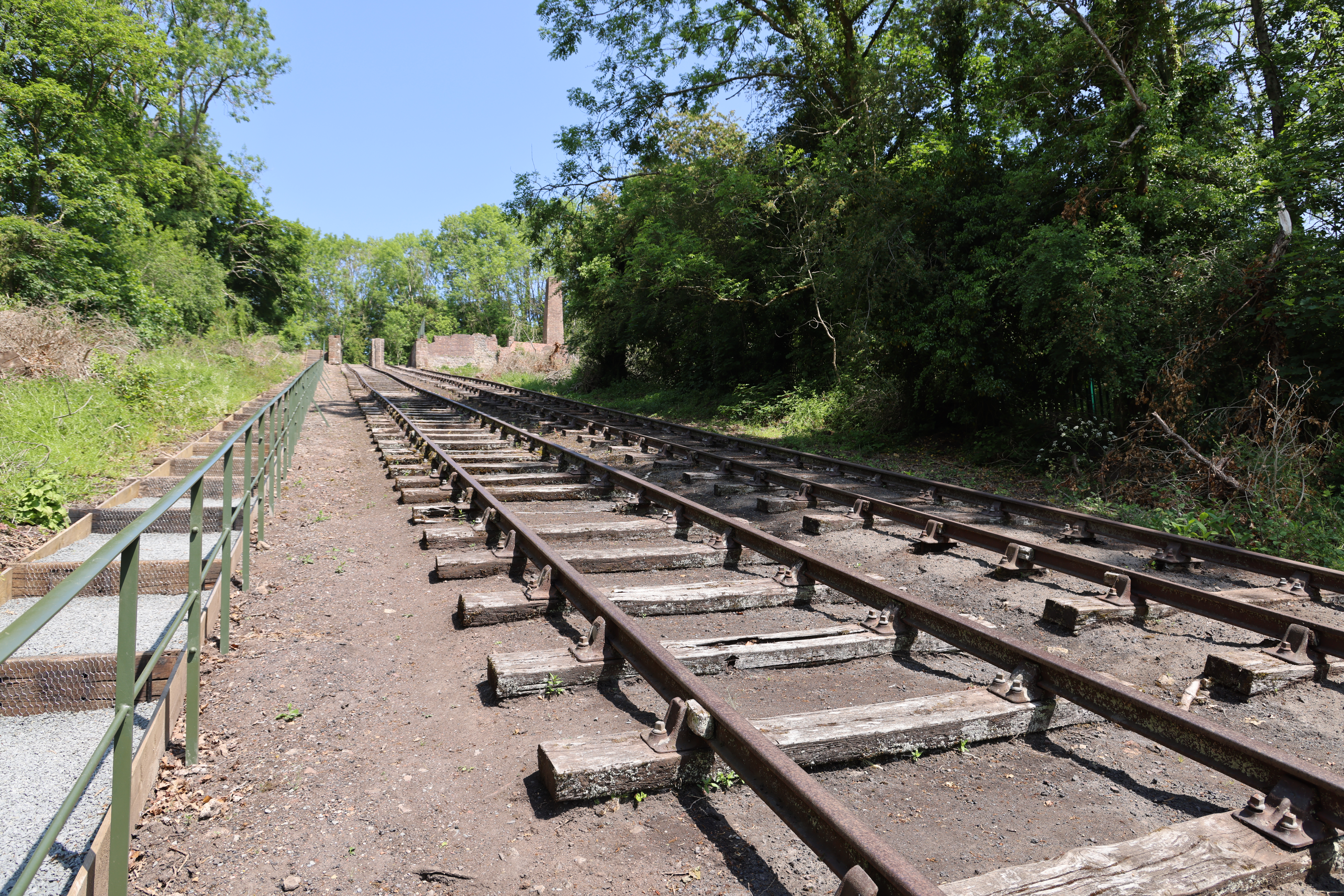
Hay Inclined Plane in 2025

The Hay Inclined Plane is a canal inclined plane with a height of 207 feet that is located on a short stretch of the Shropshire Canal that linked the industrial area of Blists Hill with the River Severn. The inclined plane was in operation from 1792 to 1894 and can be visited as part of the Blists Hill Victorian Town and is also a waypoint on the South Telford Heritage Trail. In operation box-shaped tub boats 20 feet long were taken up and down the plane on twin railway tracks, an empty boat would be loaded into the river at the bottom and a full boat would be loaded into the canal at the top, a rope would connect the two so that gravity would drop the loaded boat down to the river counterbalanced by an empty boat being raised to the canal. At the bottom of the incline the rails went underwater allowing the boats to float free.

== Filming location ==
Blists Hill has been used as a filming location on several occasions. In 1979, the children's television series Blue Peter included an item shot at the museum. The director of the piece subsequently chose it to be the principal filming location for the 1985 Doctor Who serial The Mark of the Rani. The 1995 film Feast of July was shot at Blists Hill. An episode of Antiques Roadshow was filmed at the location in September 2009. In 2010, Victorian Pharmacy, which was a historical documentary looking at life in the 19th century, used Blists Hill to recreate the scene at an everyday pharmacy.

== See also ==
- Beamish Museum
- Lee Dingle Bridge
- Living museum
- Avoncroft Museum
- Black Country Living Museum
