= Hopton Wafers =

Village in Shropshire, England

Coordinates: 52.385°N 2.534°W

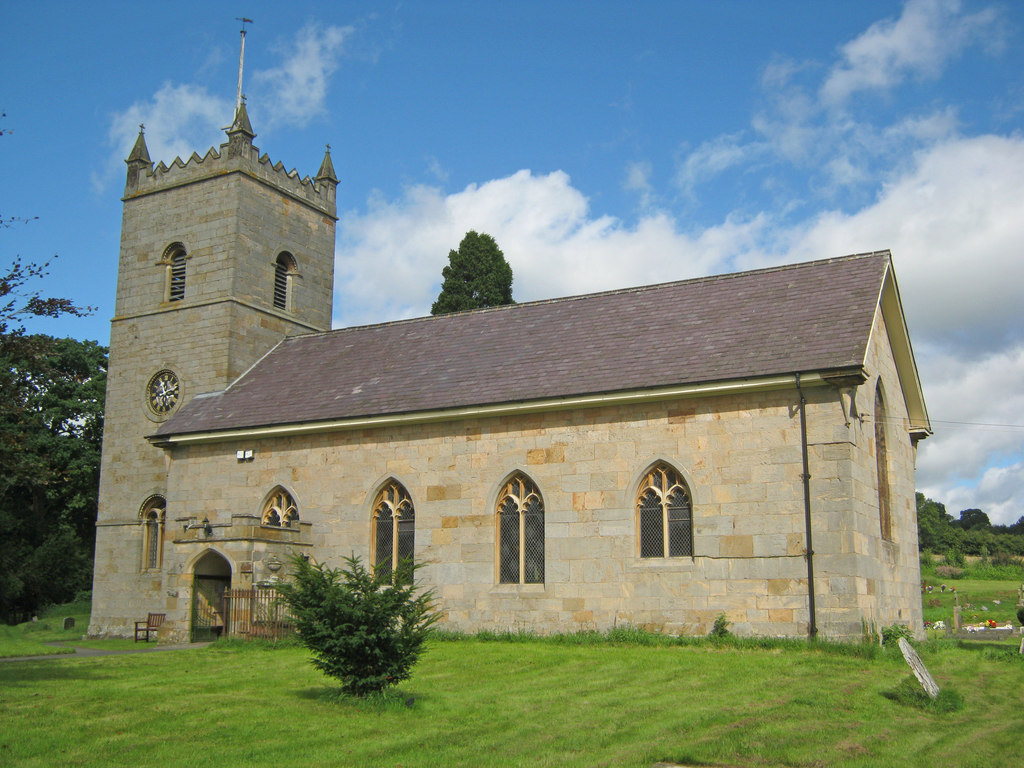
- St Michael and All Angels' Church, Hopton Wafers

- Location within Shropshire
- Population: 753 (2011)
- OS grid reference: SO636765
- Civil parish: Hopton Wafers
- Unitary authority: Shropshire
- Ceremonial county: Shropshire
- Region: West Midlands
- Country: England
- Sovereign state: United Kingdom
- Post town: KIDDERMINSTER
- Postcode district: DY14
- Dialling code: 01299
- Police: West Mercia
- Fire: Shropshire
- Ambulance: West Midlands
- UK Parliament: Ludlow

Hopton Wafers is a small village and civil parish in south Shropshire, England. The population of the public parish at the 2011 census was 753. The village is at the north of the A4117 road, and to the west of the market town of Cleobury Mortimer.

Its name is derived from Old English hop (a side valley running off a larger valley, originally from a Celtic word) and tun (farm or settlement), along with the name of Robert de Wafre, an early holder of the manor.

A post-medieval glassworks was in Hopton Wafers which produced glass in the 17th and 18th centuries.

The village church, St Michael and All Angels, was built in 1825: a Norman church had previously stood on the site, but had become dilapidated. The works were funded by Thomas Botfield, who had purchased the manor in 1812. The church contains two war memorials: a marble plaque to men of the parish of Hopton Wafers with Doddington who died serving in the World Wars and another plaque to Lance Corporal Samuel Edwards, KSLI, who was killed in World War I in 1915. The churchyard contains war graves of another KSLI soldier who died in the latter war and of a Royal Army Service Corps soldier of World War II who are among those listed on the parish memorial.

There is a pub in the village, named The Crown at Hopton.

The county's last remaining emergency escape lane (a sand trap for vehicles unable to brake) was removed in 2014 after being deemed both obsolete and potentially dangerous; it was located at the foot of Hopton Bank (on the A4117).

The 292 bus service (Ludlow-Bewdley-Kidderminster), operated by Diamond Bus, provides regular public buses from Monday to Saturday.

== See also ==
- Listed buildings in Hopton Wafers
