= Listed buildings in Stirchley and Brookside =

Stirchley and Brookside is a civil parish in the district of Telford and Wrekin, Shropshire, England, and contains the settlements of Stirchley and Brookside. In the parish are five listed buildings that are recorded in the National Heritage List for England. Of these, one is listed at Grade I, the highest of the three grades, and the others are at Grade II, the lowest grade. The most important listed building in the parish is a 12th-century church, and the other listed buildings are farmhouses and farm buildings.

== Key ==
Grade	Criteria
I	Buildings of exceptional interest, sometimes considered to be internationally important
II	Buildings of national importance and special interest

== Buildings ==
Name and location	Photograph	Date	Notes	Grade
St James' Church; 52.65737°N 2.44518°W		12th century	The church was originally in stone, the nave and tower were encased in brick in about 1740, and an aisle was added in 1838. The church consists of a nave, a north aisle, a chancel, and a west tower. The chancel is in Norman style, and the nave and tower are Georgian. The tower has a round-headed west doorway, round-headed bell openings, and a pyramidal roof with a weathervane and a finial.	I
Grange Farm Farmhouse; 52.65993°N 2.44130°W	—	Early 17th century	A cross-wing was added to the farmhouse at the end of the 17th century. The building is in red brick with tile roofs; the roof of the original range is gable-ended and the cross-wing has a hipped roof. There are two storeys and attics, stone quoins, and windows of various types.	II
Stirchley Hall Farmhouse; 52.65637°N 2.44688°W	—	1653	The original part of the farmhouse is in stone, and a two-bay red brick cross-wing was added in 1721. There are two storeys, the original range contains mullioned windows, at the north end is a massive chimney stack, and in the cross-wing there are quoins. There are dated plaques on the original range and on the chimney stack.	II
Stables north of Stirchley Hall Farmhouse; 52.65670°N 2.44703°W	—	18th century	The stable range is in stone with a tile roof. There is one storey and an attic, and the building contains stable doorways, windows and a cart entrance.	II
Stables northwest of Stirchley Hall Farmhouse; 52.65649°N 2.44736°W	—	18th or 19th century	The stables have four bays in stone and one in brick, and a tile roof with gable ends. There are two storeys, and the building contains two-light casement windows and doorways with segmental heads. (Note: Street View in June 2015 shows that both stable ranges have been converted for residential use.)	II

== Notes and references ==
=== Sources ===
- Historic England, "Church of St James, Stirchley and Brookside (1352002)", National Heritage List for England
- Historic England, "Grange Farm Farmhouse, Stirchley and Brookside (1292585)", National Heritage List for England
- Historic England, "Stirchley Hall Farmhouse, Stirchley and Brookside (1209559)", National Heritage List for England
- Historic England, "Stables immediately to north of Stirchley Hall Farmhouse, Stirchley and Brookside (1352003)", National Heritage List for England
- Historic England, "Stables immediately north-west of Stirchley Hall Farmhouse, Stirchley and Brookside (1033304)", National Heritage List for England
- Historic England, Listed Buildings
- Newman, John; Pevsner, Nikolaus (2006), Shropshire, The Buildings of England, New Haven and London: Yale University Press, ISBN 0-300-12083-4
