= Telford Town Park =

Park located in Telford, Shropshire

Coordinates: 52.664°N 2.447°W

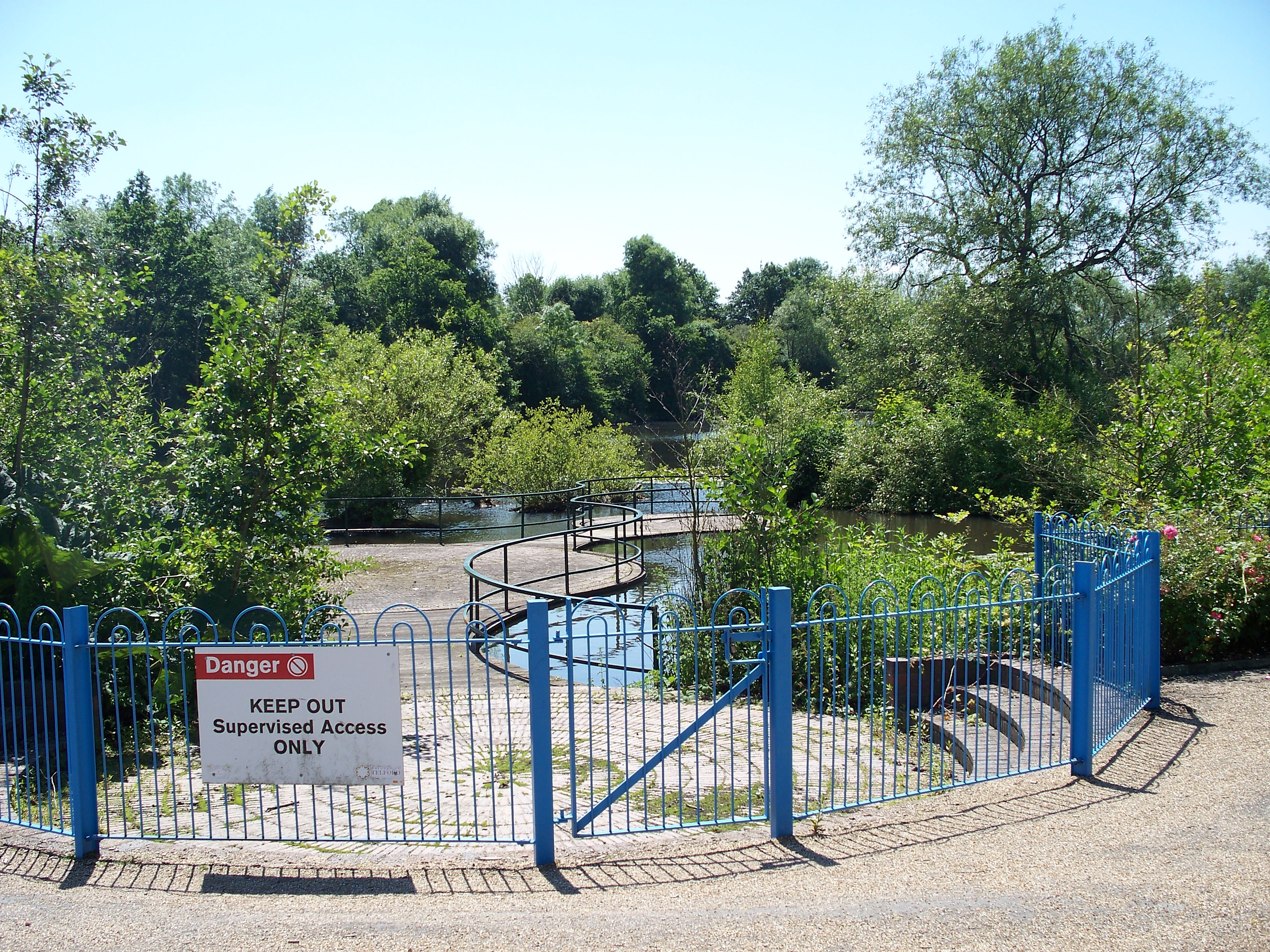
The Withy Pool in Telford Town Park.

Telford Town Park is a park and Local Nature Reserve in Telford in Shropshire. In 2015, it was voted "UK's Best Park" in the inaugural public competition organised by Fields in Trust.

== History ==
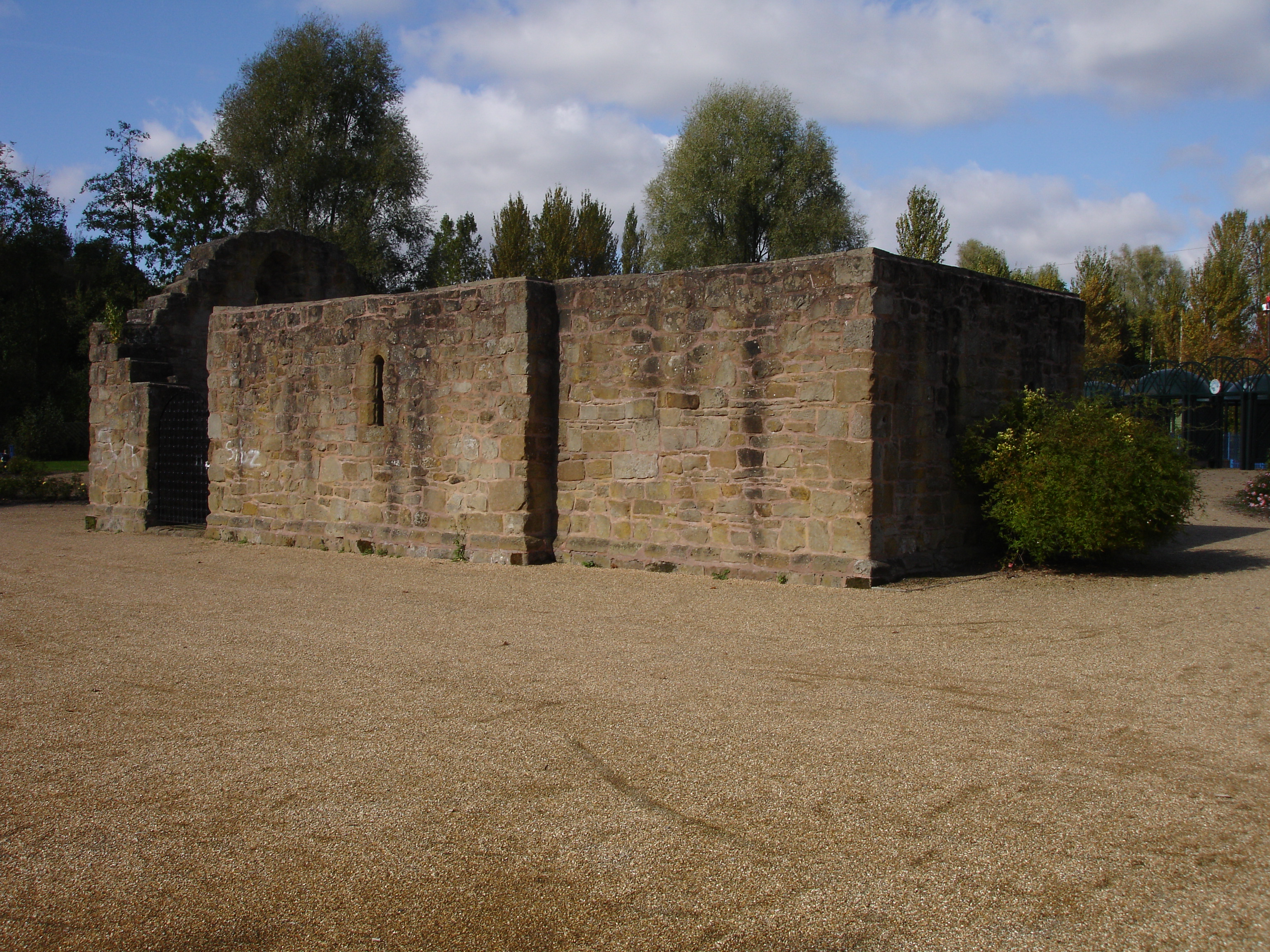
Malinslee Chapel in Telford Town Park.

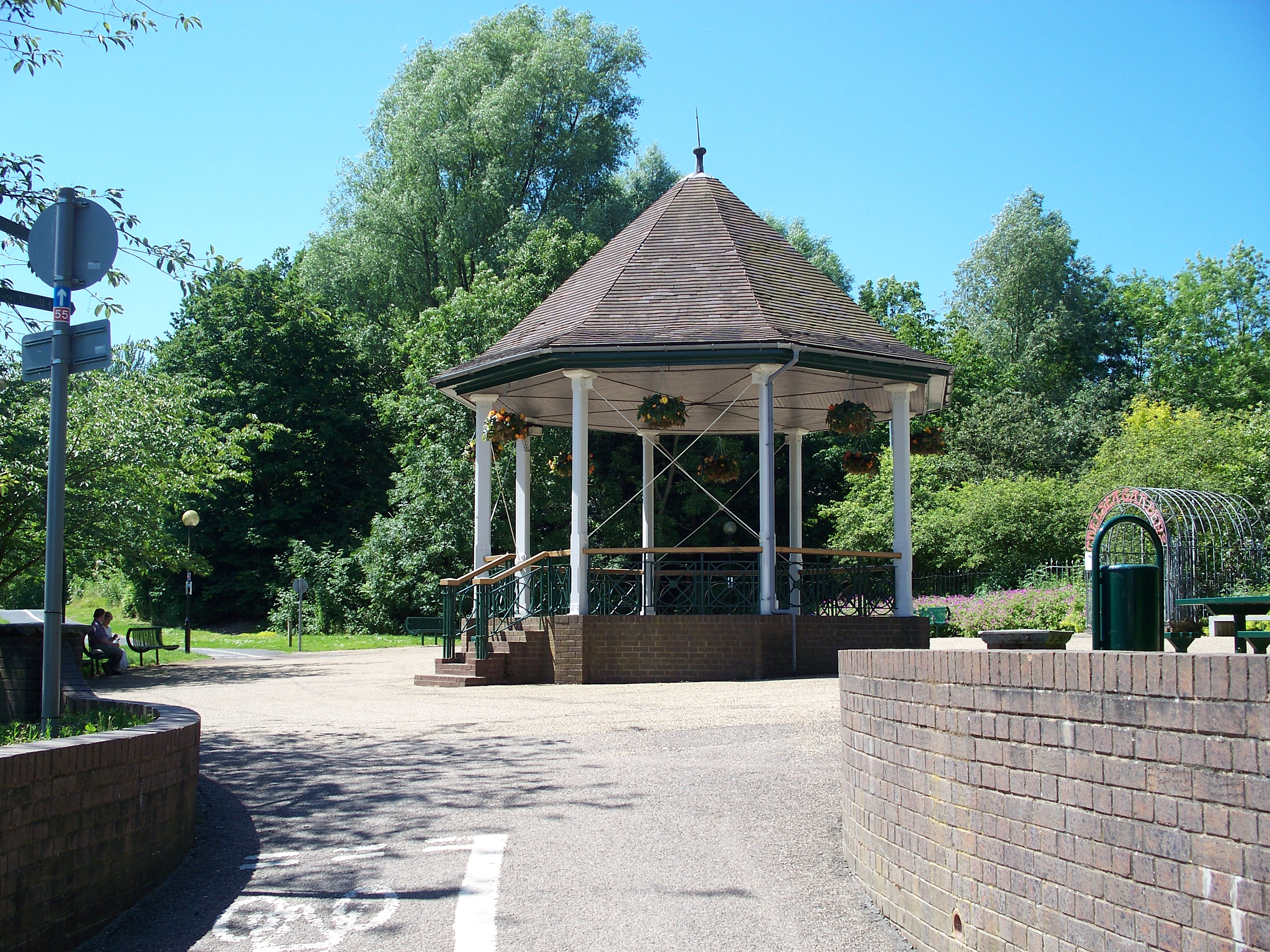
The Bandstand in Telford Town Park.

The Anglo-Saxon period saw the first real changes made to the area later to become Telford Town Park. Early settlers cleared woodland to create land suitable for farming. These became the starting points for places like Dawley, Stirchley and Malinslee, the key catchment areas that surround Telford Town Park ('Ley' is an Anglo-Saxon word meaning a clearing in the wood). In the 13th century much of the land around Stirchley was given to the Cistercian monks of Buildwas Abbey. It was these monks who built the original Grange at Stirchley and farmed the surrounding land until 1536. The relatively peaceful scene of small farmsteads separated by hedges and woodlands continued until the dramatic changes brought about by the Industrial Revolution. Valuable raw materials such as coal and ironstone were mined, and this produced enormous amounts of waste which created the pit mounds seen in the Park today. The Shropshire Canal ran through the Park and new industries grew up alongside the canal – iron furnaces, foundries and forges at Hinkshay and on the Stirchley Chimney site. Most of the industries belonged to the Old Park Company, set up by Isaac Hawkins Browne who lived at Stirchley Grange.

The Wellington Iron and Coal Company built the Stirchley Chimney in 1873; however, due to bankruptcy in 1877, the furnace seen today was never fired. This site was bought by the Wrekin Chemical Company in 1886 and used to manufacture naphtha charcoal and lime salts until the locals complained about the smell. The last mine, Grange Pit, closed in 1894; however, new industries soon arrived to produce kerbstones and paving slabs. By the 1960s industries had moved from the area leaving behind a trail of derelict remains soon to be reclaimed by nature. Despite all this industrial activity, plants and animals soon returned and those following the paths will find mining and factory remains amongst the trees and meadows. The pit mounds evolved into small heathland and woodlands and hedgerows grew alongside the old canal and railway tracks and the quarries became pools.

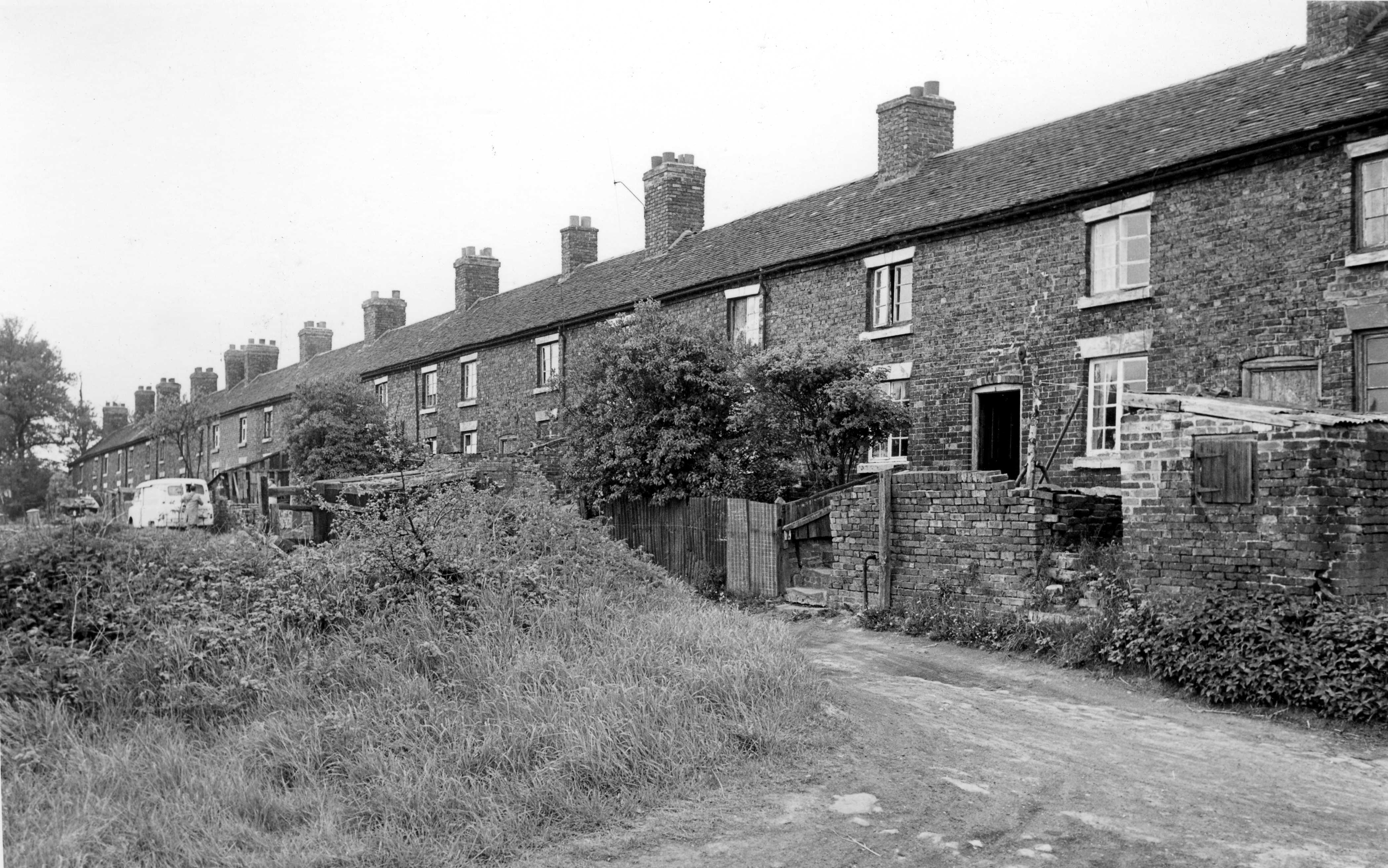
The Old Stone Row Cottages.

More recently during the 1970s, Telford Development Corporation (TDC) developed what is today known as Telford Town Park. TDC's remit was to provide a 'Green Lung' for the people of the New Town and by 1984 the 170 hectare Town Park evolved. In 1992 the Park was handed over to what was then Wrekin Council which in 1998 became the new Unitary Authority the Borough of Telford & Wrekin, (later changed to Telford and Wrekin Council). The original concept of the Park was to provide an area of green open space right in the heart of the new industrial town and with its central locality the Park is well served by a road infrastructure designed in the 1970s.

The London & North Western Railway's Coalport Branch Line ran through the park to Coalport via Stirchley & Madeley Market after the failure of the Shropshire Canal. This became the Silkin Way some years after the closure of the railway (then British Railways after nationalisation) to passengers in 1952 and to goods on 5 December 1960. On 9 April 1980 the 2 ft (610 mm) gauge Telford Town Tramway was opened by the Reverend W. Awdry on the trackbed of the Coalport branch alongside Randlay Pool in the Park. The tramway only lasted a few years before it closed in the mid-1980s. The tram has since been preserved by the Telford Steam Railway running on its own circular track by Horsehay Pool. As well as the LNWR Coalport branch, a freight-only Great Western Railway branch from Hollinswood Junction on the Wolverhampton-Shrewsbury line just east of the present day Telford Central station, ran south through the park on the east side of what is now Randlay Pool, terminating near the Stirchley Chimney. Opened in 1908, this short lived line was closed on 2 February 1959. A footpath runs parallel to, and partly on, the alignment of this branch on the east side of Randlay Lake.

== Parks for People ==
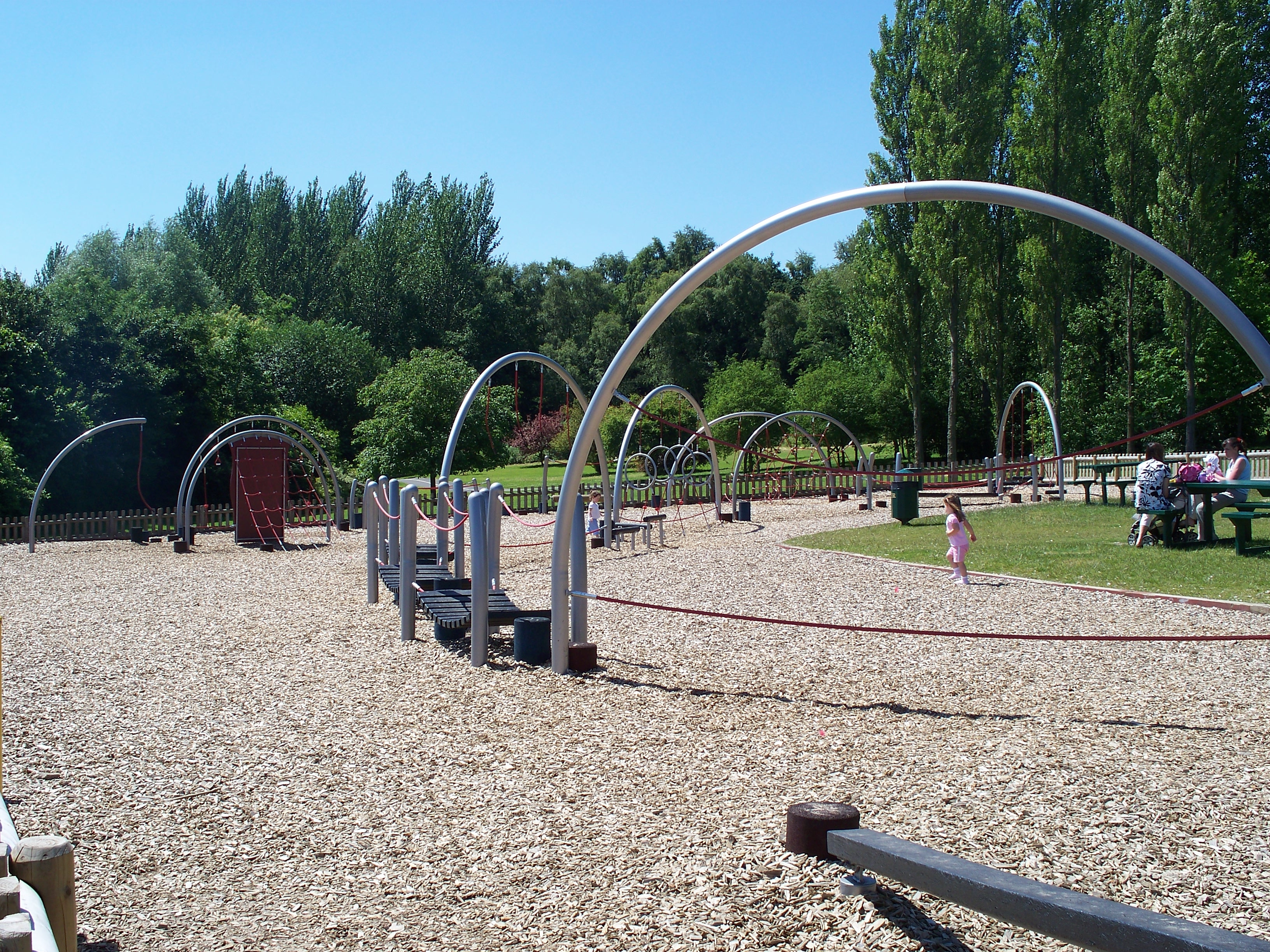
The Trim Trail Play Area in Telford Town Park.

The Parks for People funding programme is a joint initiative between the Heritage Lottery Fund and Big Lottery Fund, offering grants for projects that regenerate public parks of national, regional or local heritage value. Telford and Wrekin Council were recently advised of their Stage 2 approval and now move into the first year of the projects five-year delivery programme.

This 5-year Project kicked off in 2011 with the first contract to deliver the Park's Master Plan starting on site Summer/Autumn. Plans included a new Teenage Activity Area, new learning zones and picnic areas throughout the wider Park, and the restoration of key historic features. Work was due for completion Summer 2012. The majority of works took place in the central and southern area of the park therefore disruption was deemed minimal to the majority of Park visitors. The remaining Master Plan work will follow and includes improved pathways, the creation of a Nature and Heritage Trail, new gateways, signage and interpretation of the Parks history and wildlife. Additional benefits delivered by the Project including an enhanced events and activities programme, and additional maintenance and management activities, will become prominent from 2012.

The Park is located off Junction 5 of the M54, is within 10 minutes walk of Telford's main bus station, 5 minutes drive time from Telford Central railway station.

== Telford parkrun ==
Telford parkrun is a weekly 5 km event for runners of all standards, which takes place every Saturday and has become extremely popular with people of all ages and abilities. On average 600 runners, joggers and walkers per week participate with help from volunteers.

== Memorials ==
In the park is a memorial, unveiled in May 2010, to residents of the Telford and Wrekin borough area who died serving their country in all spheres since World War I. Sculpted by Malcolm Sear, whose workshops were at Jackfield, it incorporates a central ironwork poppy. The inscription, "Honouring those of this borough who served and sacrificed for us all", is shared between two pieces of Kilkenny stone.

A memorial to commemorate the Holocaust was unveiled on Holocaust Memorial Day on 27 January 2014 by David Wright MP and Dr Eve Clevenger.

A COVID-19 Memorial Garden was more recently created to commemorate lives lost in the COVID-19 pandemic which began in 2020. The focal point is a sculpture representing a human head.

== Flora & Fauna ==
The 62 hectare Local Nature Reserve hosts woodland, heathland, grassland and pools that have developed as a result of the Park's industrial past.

=== Flora ===
The industrial history of the site is reflected in the habitats and wildlife that it now supports. Historically, the Park would have predominantly been broadleaved woodland. Due to the activities of Saxon land clearance and subsequent land management through the medieval ages, this would have been converted to a patchwork of arable farmland, grassland and copses. By the Industrial Revolution, much of the Park area would have contained spoil mounds and quarry pits with isolated remnants of woodland and grassland habitats. Since the abandonment of industry, the pit mounds and surrounding areas have reverted to heathland and extensive areas of grassland; the quarried areas have become lakes and ponds; and woodland, scrub and hedges have established elsewhere, including alongside the old canal and railway. This mosaic of different habitats now support a variety of wildlife including birds, invertebrates, amphibians, reptiles, bats and other mammals. In recognition of the educational and amenity value of this biodiversity resource, a significant proportion of the Park has been designated as a statutory Local Nature Reserve (LNR) (Figure 1.1).

=== Fauna ===
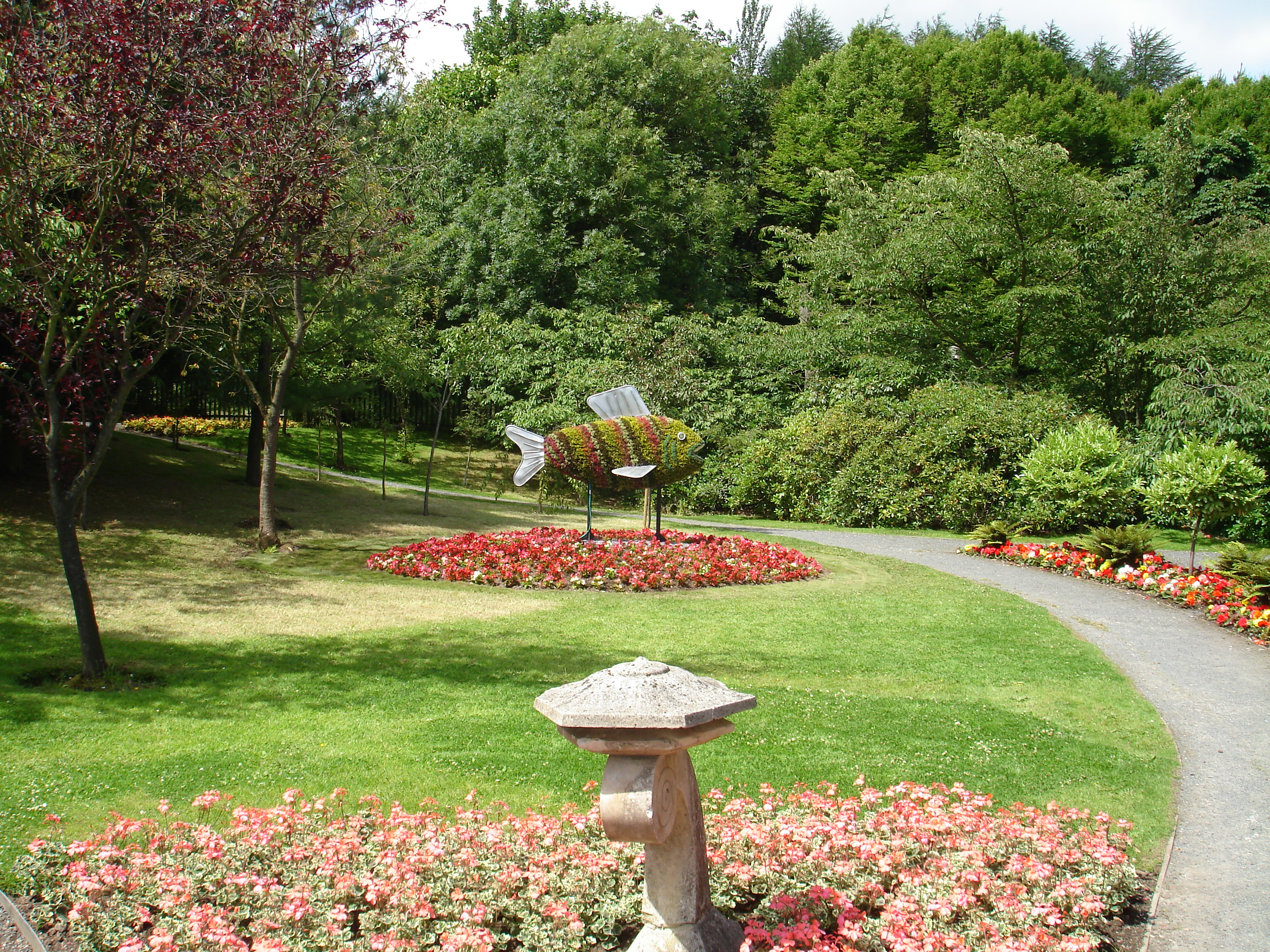
The Flower Fish in Telford Town Park.

There are currently a number of endangered species in and around the park which have been discovered through previous surveys. These studies have shown that there were as of 2010 two out of Britain's sixteen species of bat nesting in the park. To protect these whilst work is going on in the park bat boxes have been put up around the area to house these.

The most noticeable mammal in the park is the grey squirrel in the wooded area. Other mammals likely to be present are small rodents such as voles, shrews and mice, although there is no confirmed data of these species being present. Four out of five of Britain's amphibian species reside within the park including the smooth and great crested newt. The only native species not recorded is the palmate newt. Amongst these newts the common frog and toad are also present. Due to the mixed woodland, scrub, water and grassland habitats within the park provides a range of suitable conditions for a good variety of birds. There are currently 60+ recorded species which do not include many common species such as herons and the black-headed gull.
