= Malinslee Chapel =

Ruined Norman chapel in Telford

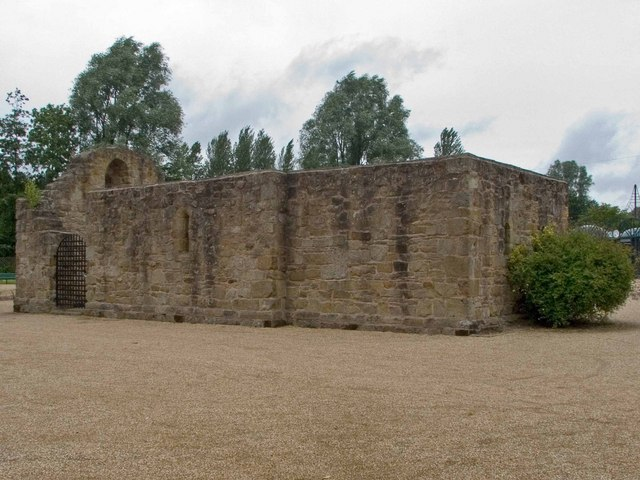
- Ruins of the chapel at Telford Town Park in 2008

- Location within Shropshire
- Interactive map of Malinslee Chapel

Monastery information
- Full name: Manislee Chapel
- Other name: Telford Normal Chapel
- Established: c.1150
- Disestablished: 17th century

Site
- Location: Telford Town Park
- Coordinates: 52.6623°N 2.4463°W
- Grid reference: grid reference SJ642044
- Visible remains: Partial ruins
- Public access: Free entry
- Other information: Moved to Telford Town Park in 1971

Malinslee Chapel was a Norman chapel located within the grounds of Malinslee Hall, Malinslee. Today, the remains of the chapel are located in Telford Town Park, Telford. The chapel is now in ruins but the east wall still contains two well splayed Norman lights with a round arched niche between.

== History ==
Malinslee Chapel was originally erected within the grounds of Malinslee Hall around the year 1150. The chapel was a small sandstone structure approximately 15 metres long, consisting of chancel and nave divided by a stone screen.

The chapel had become a ruin by the 17th century, and in 1786, Rev Williams produced a painting of the ruins. In 1909, the ruin was bought by Edward Parry, vicar of Malinslee, who proposed to restore it as a place of worship to designs by W. A. Webb, but nothing came of this. When Malinslee Hall was demolished in 1971 to make way for the new Telford Town Centre, the chapel was dismantled by the Telford Development Corporation and later re-assembled in the nearby Telford Town Park by the Withy Pool.

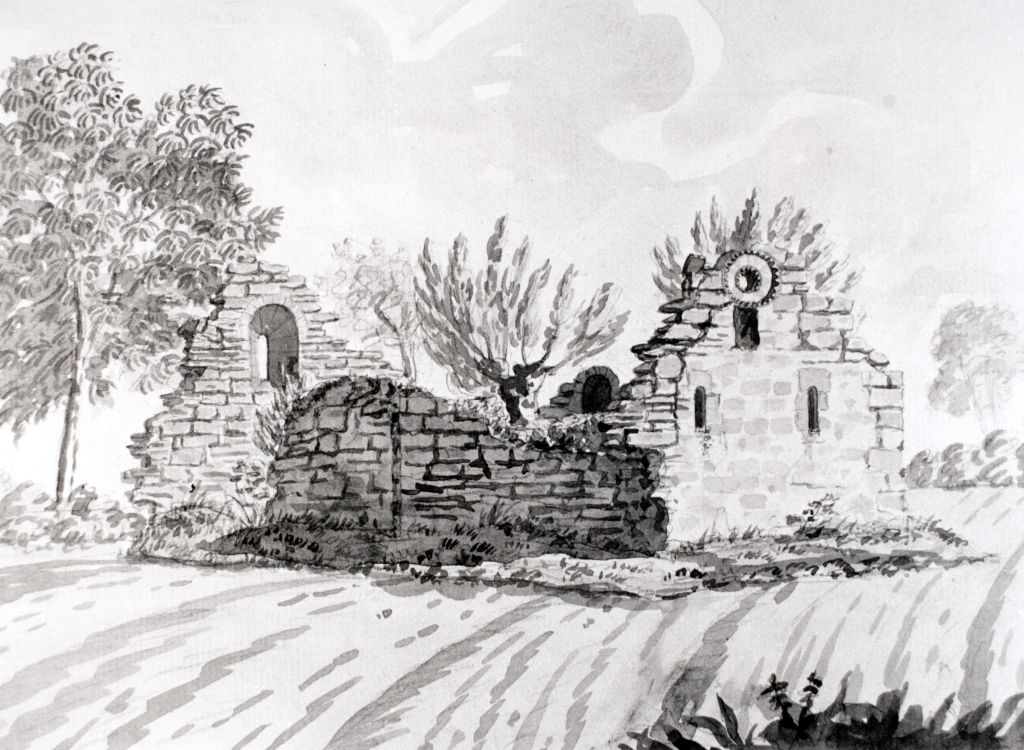
Painting of the ruins of Malinslee Chapel on the grounds of Malinslee Hall by Rev Williams, 1786
