= St James' Church, Stirchley =

Coordinates: 52.6573°N 2.4452°W

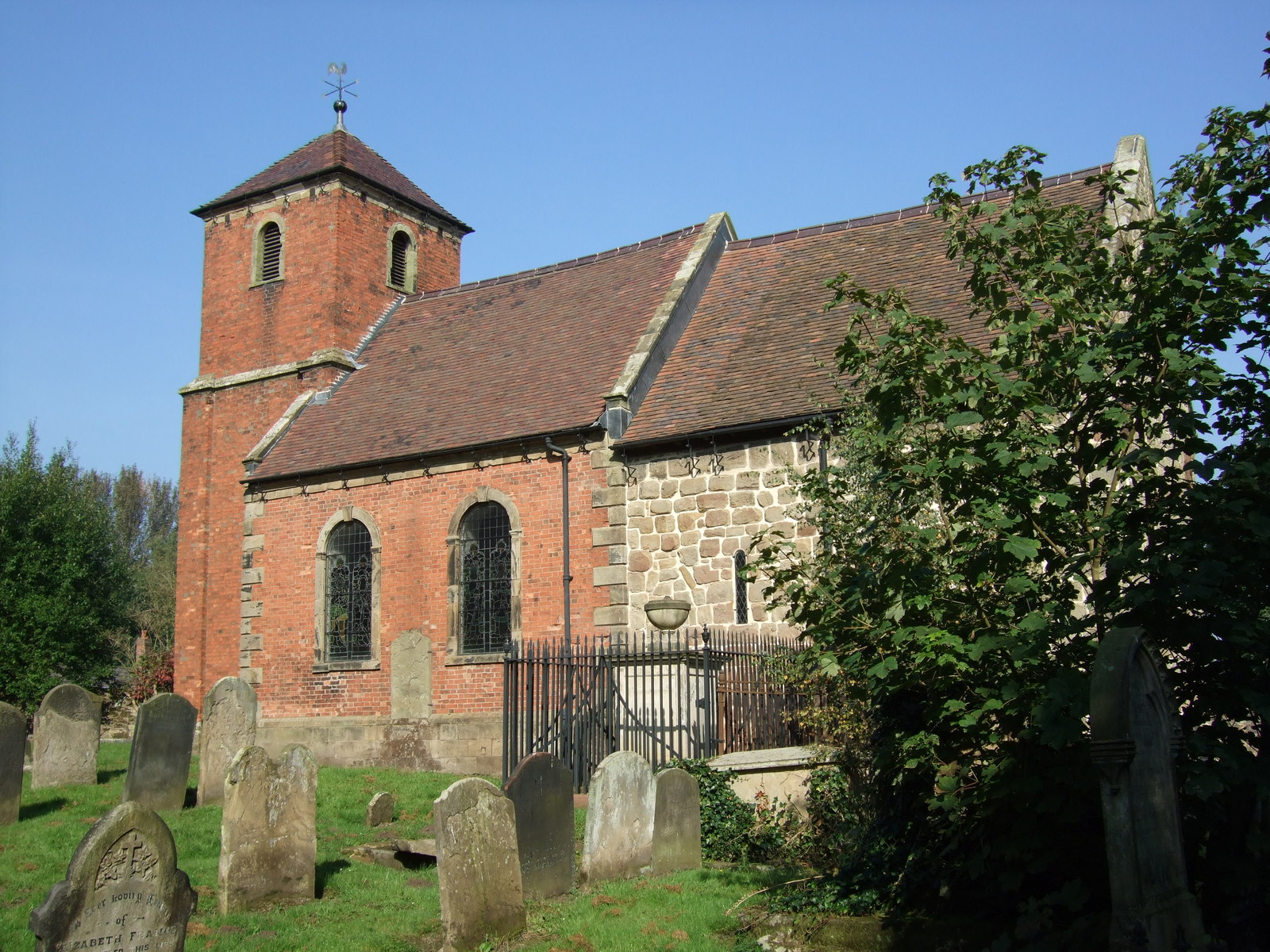
- St James Church

- Location in Shropshire
- OS grid reference: SJ 699 067
- Location: Stirchley, Shropshire
- Country: England
- Denomination: Anglican
- Website: Churches Conservation Trust

History
- Dedication: Saint James

Architecture
- Functional status: Redundant
- Heritage designation: Grade I
- Designated: 8 April 1983
- Architectural type: Church
- Style: Norman, Georgian
- Groundbreaking: 12th century
- Completed: 1838
- Closed: 1975

Specifications
- Materials: Sandstone chancel, Brick nave and tower with sandstone dressings

St James' Church is a redundant Anglican church in Stirchley, Shropshire, England. The church is recorded in the National Heritage List for England as a designated Grade I listed building, and is under the care of the Churches Conservation Trust. The churchyard is designated as a Scheduled ancient monument.

== History ==
The church was built in the 12th century. In about 1740 the masonry of the nave and tower was encased in brick, and the tower was heightened. A north aisle was added in 1838 for the use of the workers in the local Old Park Ironworks, owned by Thomas Botfield. The church was declared redundant on 1 November 1975, and was vested in the Churches Conservation Trust on 30 March 2006.

== Architecture ==
=== Exterior ===
The plan of the church is simple, consisting of a nave with a north aisle, a chancel, and a west tower. The chancel is in Norman style, and constructed in squared yellow sandstone blocks. The nave and tower are in Georgian style, and constructed in red brick with sandstone dressings. The chancel has round-headed lancet windows, and one south window with Y-tracery. In the nave there are two round-headed windows, and there a more round-headed windows in the north aisle. The tower is in three stages. In the bottom stage is a round-headed west doorway, and above it in the middle stage is a large round-headed window. The top stage has round-headed bell openings on each side. On the summit of the tower is a pyramidal roof with a finial and a weathervane.

=== Interior ===
The most impressive internal structure is the Norman chancel arch. It consists of two orders of shafts and three orders of voussoirs, and is decorated with carvings of chain links, rosettes in lozenges, and two types of chevrons. The capitals are carved with scallops and foliage. The architectural historians John Newman and Nikolaus Pevsner describe the arch as being "quite incongruously ornate". Also in the church is a west gallery with a balustraded front, and a north gallery with tiered seating. The pulpit, reading desk, and box pews all date from about 1740, and were rearranged in 1838.

There is brass plaque to men of Stirchley who died serving World War I, as well as a row of four shields bearing each a name, three to men who died in the latter war, and one in World War II. The church also preserves a huge wooden roll of honour of men who served in World War I which was moved from St Luke's Church, Doseley (closed 1975).

There is a ring of three bells. These were cast in 1410 by John de Colsale, in 1594 by Henry II Oldfield, and in 1664 by Thomas II Clibury.

== See also ==
- Grade I listed churches in Shropshire
- Listed buildings in Stirchley and Brookside
- List of churches preserved by the Churches Conservation Trust in the English Midlands
