= Lee Dingle Bridge =

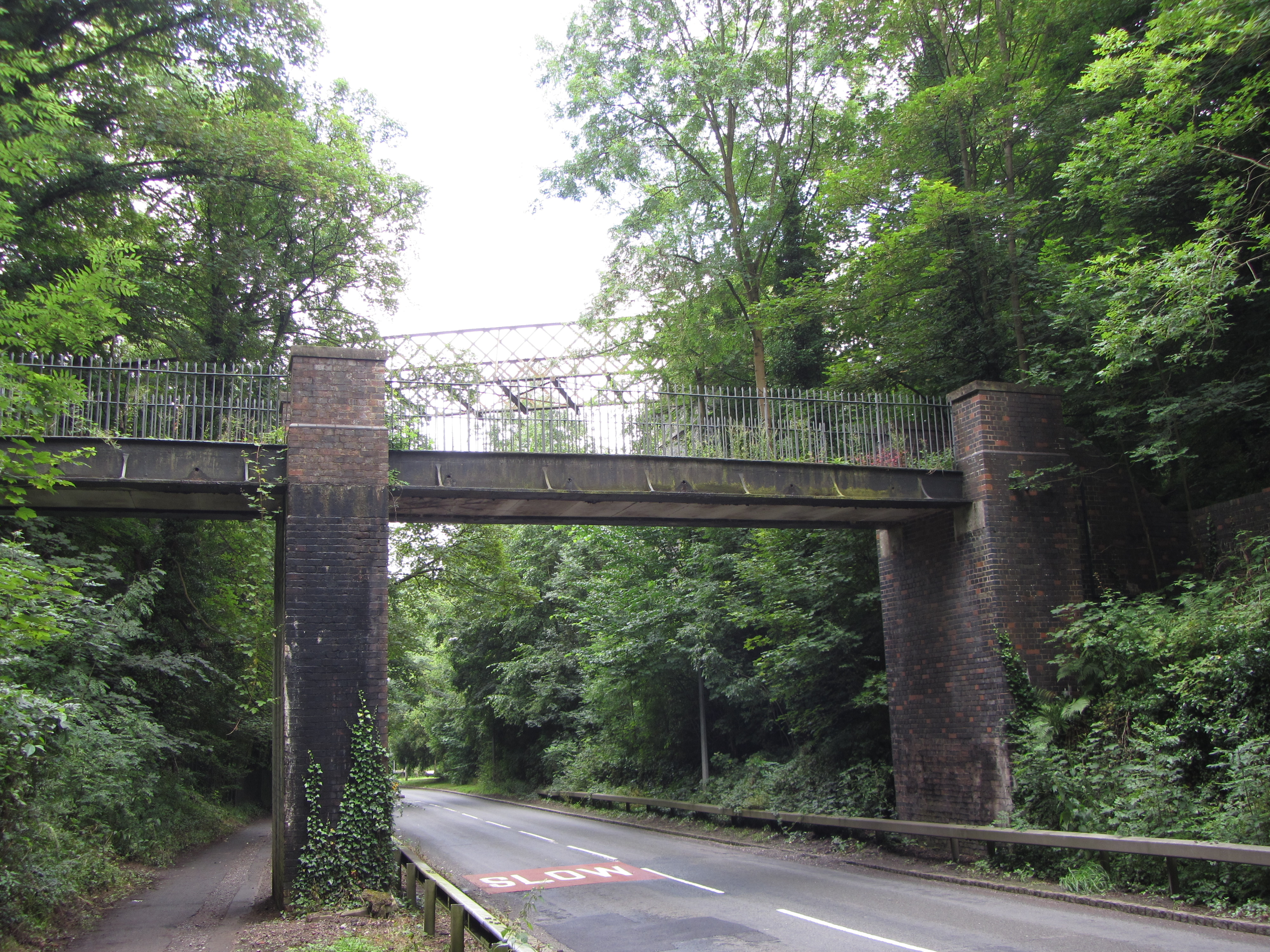
- The derelict Lee Dingle Bridge with the current footbridge across the Coalport Road in the foreground.
- Carries: Meadow Pit Plateway (from Madeley Colliery)
- Crosses: Lee Dingle (Coalport Road)
- Locale: Blists Hill, Ironbridge
- Heritage status: Grade II listed building
- National Heritage List for England: 1367428

Characteristics
- Design: Truss
- Material: Wrought iron

History
- Opened: 1872
- Closed: 1922
- Replaces: Timber trestle bridge

Statistics
- Daily traffic: Coal

The Lee Dingle Bridge is a wrought iron truss bridge across the Lee Dingle in Ironbridge, Shropshire. The bridge is a Grade II listed building. It is derelict and has had no deck since the 1960s.

== History ==
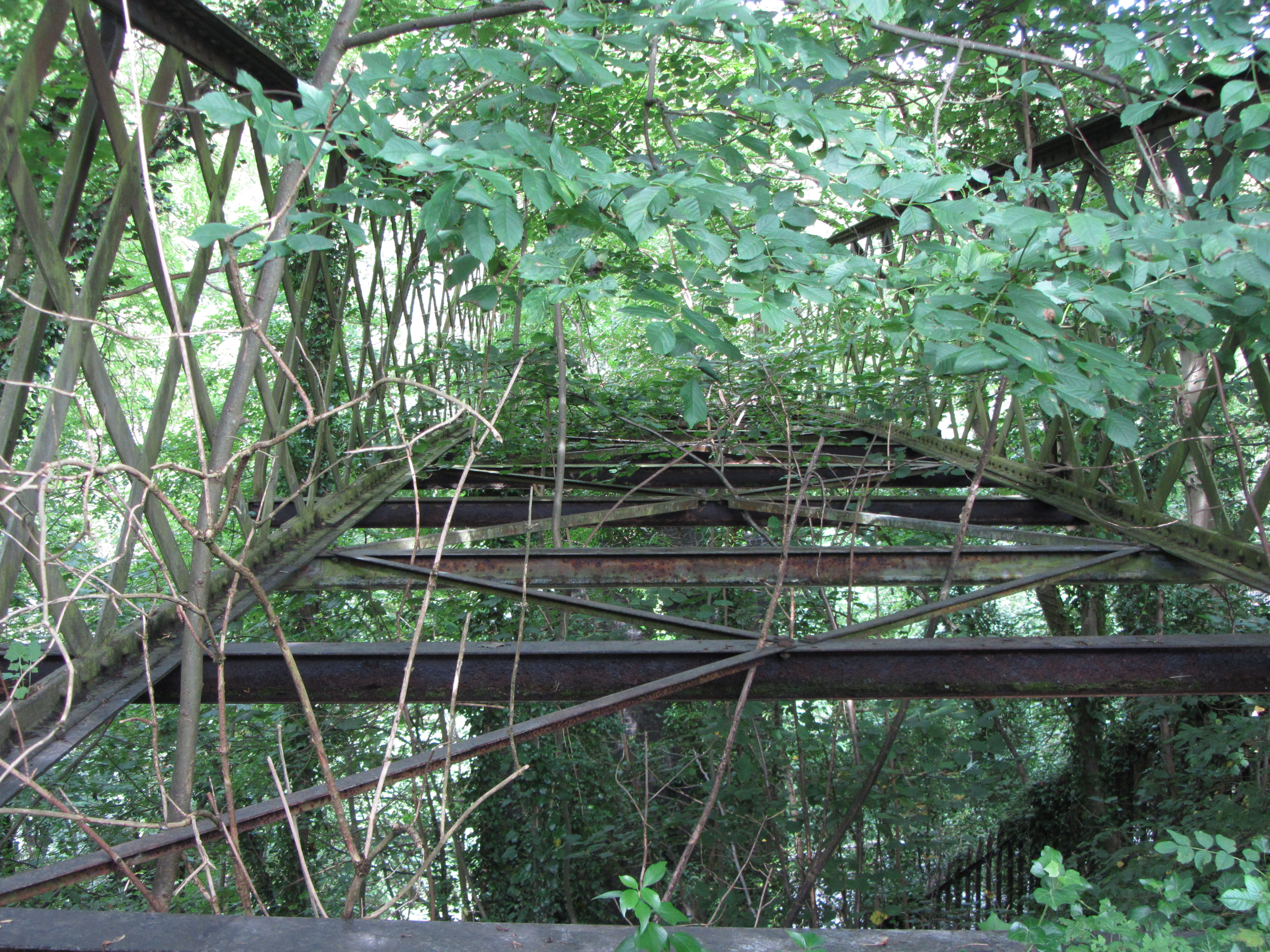
The bridge as seen from Blists Hill Victorian Town today.

The bridge was built to carry the plateway which brought coal from the Madeley Colliery to the Blists Hill furnaces. It replaced a timber trestle viaduct built when the London and North Western Railway's Coalport branch line was constructed. On the far side of the bridge from Blists Hill was an inclined plane known as Bagley's Wind, which still survives in part as a brick pathway.

== Current status ==
The bridge forms part of the Blists Hill living museum. Most buildings there are reconstructions but blast furnaces, a mine, a brick and tile works and the Lee Dingle Bridge are original to the location.
