= Brookside, Telford =

Coordinates: 52.6547°N 2.4351°W

Brookside
- Estate
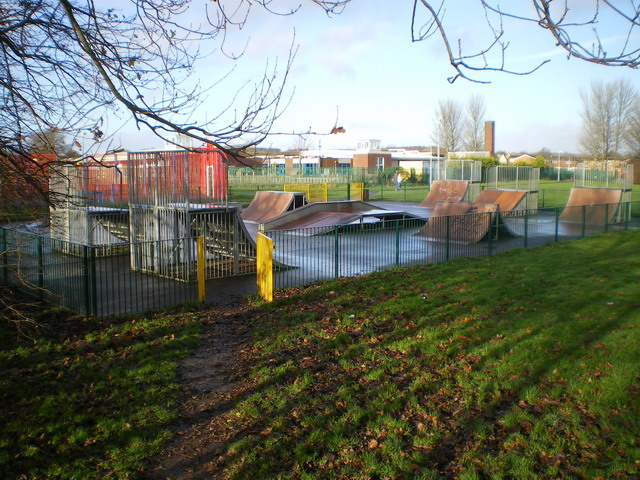
- Bike park and play area, Brookside

- Location within Shropshire
- Population: 6,923 2011 Census
- OS grid reference: SJ 703056
- Civil parish: Stirchley and Brookside
- Unitary authority: Telford and Wrekin
- Ceremonial county: Shropshire
- Region: West Midlands
- Country: England
- Sovereign state: United Kingdom
- Post town: BROOKSIDE
- Postcode district: TF3
- Dialling code: 01952
- Police: West Mercia
- Fire: Shropshire
- Ambulance: West Midlands
- UK Parliament: Telford; The Wrekin

Brookside is a housing estate and suburb of Telford in the Telford and Wrekin borough of Shropshire, England. The original settlement of Brookside is a Radburn estate built in the early 1970s as part of the development of Telford New Town and is entirely within the confines of Brookside Avenue. Significant development has taken place around the outside of Brookside Avenue since the estate was built, the majority of which is part of Stirchley Park but falls within the Brookside ward for both Telford and Wrekin Council and Stirchley and Brookside Parish Council.

== History ==
There is little recorded history of Brookside given its relative unimportance compared to neighbouring Stirchley with its ancient manor and historic church. The Brookside area was farm land prior to development of the Brookside estate. In the 1970s a housing estate was built on the farm land which was named Brookside, a reference to it being situated alongside the Mad Brook (more accurately, Made Brook which gives the nearby town of Madeley its name).

A deserted medieval settlement named Oulmeyre was recorded in the 13th century near Holmer Lake which was part of the Brookside parish council ward until boundary changes in 2015 created a new Holmer Lake ward.

=== Regeneration ===
Following decades of underinvestment in maintaining the fabric of the estate, a regeneration programme was started for the Brookside Local Centre which by June 2014 had seen the local shops relocated to a new building and work started on the renovation and expansion of the community centre. Running alongside the physical regeneration is a lottery-funded, resident-led social regeneration programme called Brookside Big Local.

== Local Government ==
On the Brookside estate, all the roads leading off Brookside Avenue (except Mount Pleasant Drive which is part of the parish of Little Dawley), Stirchley Park and most of Stirchley Village are part of the Brookside ward for both Telford and Wrekin Council and Stirchley and Brookside parish council. Following a review of local government boundaries, a new single member ward for Holmer Lake for the parish council was created in 2015.

There are currently 7 parish councillors representing Brookside ward and 2 borough councillors, both of whom were also elected as parish councillors in the 2015 local election.

== Community Groups ==
A number of community groups operate in Brookside, almost all of them confined to the parts of the ward inside Brookside Avenue. The Brookside (Telford) Community Interest Company which was originally formed to run the Brookside Community Café (currently suspended whilst regeneration of the community centre takes place) has assisted the formation of some local groups by providing public liability insurance and limited funding. Further support and motivation for the formation of community groups has been provided by the Locality Community Organiser for Brookside.

=== Brookside Improvement Group ===
Brookside Improvement Group (BIG) was the first residents' group in Brookside and is recognised by Telford and Wrekin Council as the representative group of the residents of Brookside. BIG is represented on the Brookside Co-operative Board, the pilot scheme for Telford & Wrekin Council's Co-operative Council policy. BIG runs the Street Champions scheme in Brookside in conjunction with the borough council and a BIG Juniors group is organised by one of the two primary schools in Brookside, Windmill Primary School.

=== Brookside Big Local ===
Brookside Big Local is the name for the lottery-funded social regeneration programme run by a steering group made up of Brookside residents which will oversee the spending of £1m of seed funding over 10 years once its plan is approved and adopted. The group has already made a small number of grants in advance of the main £1m funding pot becoming available.

=== Brookside Events Group ===
Brookside Events Group (BEG) was set up in 2013 by local mothers who were motivated by a lack of events for local youngsters to form a group to put on events primarily for the benefit of local children but also for other residents. As of 2014, BEG have organised a coffee morning, children's Halloween party, an Easter party and a ladies night and organised a summer fair for July 2014.

=== Telford Bikes ===
Telford Bikes is a social enterprise set up to recycle bikes which are sold at low cost or donated to local residents with the objective of helping them reduce their reliance on public transport and private car journeys. The group also provide training and coaching on bike maintenance to local residents and have used the profits to support events in the area.
