= Thomas Botfield =

English metallurgist, geologist, and inventor (1762–1843)

Thomas Botfield FRS (14 February 1762 – 17 January 1843) was an English metallurgist, geologist, magistrate and deputy-lieutenant of Shropshire, and inventor of a method of smelting and making iron using the principle of "gas flame or heated air in the blast of furnaces". Botfield's 1828 patent seems to have anticipated most of the elements of the blast furnace as it was used in the 1830s and 1840s.

His father was Thomas Botfield (1738–1801) who acquired a fortune from collieries and iron manufacture, his mother Margaret, only daughter of William Baker of Bromley, Worfield, Shropshire. Thomas Botfield, the younger, born at Dawley, Shropshire, in 1762, was educated at the endowed school of Cleobury Mortimer. He worked as a colliery manager and married in 1800. Seated at Hopton Court in Hopton Wafers, whose manor he purchased in 1812, he funded the rebuilding of Hopton's parish church in 1825. He served as High Sheriff of Shropshire in 1818

He was elected F.R.S. on 18 April 1833.

He was one of the original members of the Geological Society, and early a fellow of the Society of Arts. He was also a Fellow of the Royal Society, and of the Horticultural Society, a member of the Royal Institution, and of the Royal Geographical and Agricultural Societies. He was a frequent attendant at the meetings of the British Association, and in his visits to the metropolis rarely missed a meeting of any society to which he belonged.

In 1842, the year before his death, he was appointed treasurer of the Salop Infirmary in Shrewsbury. He died in January 1843 aged 80.

== See also ==
- Hot blast
