= Preens Eddy =

Hamlet in Shropshire, England

Coordinates: 52.619°N 2.453°W

Preens Eddy is a hamlet in the Telford and Wrekin district of Shropshire, England. It lies on the south bank of the River Severn, opposite Coalport.

== Location and remains of the settlement today ==
Preens Eddy is a hamlet on the south bank of the River Severn between the Woodbridge Inn, next to Coalport Bridge, and the settlement of The Tuckies on the eastern edge of Jackfield where the Memorial Footbridge crosses the Severn. During the mid-20th century a further settlement, the Werps, separated Preens Eddy from The Tuckies; The Werps will be considered as the western boundary of Preens Eddy, the River Severn its northern boundary, the Woodbridge Inn its eastern boundary and the track of the old Great Western Railway line its southern boundary. This means that the most notable landmark of Preens Eddy is the bridge over the Severn linking Broseley with Coalport, originally made of wood and hence called the "Wood Bridge", in contrast to its counterpart made of iron further upstream, famously known as the "Iron Bridge". The origin of the name Preens Eddy (or Preen's Eddy) is unclear.

== Coalport Bridge ==
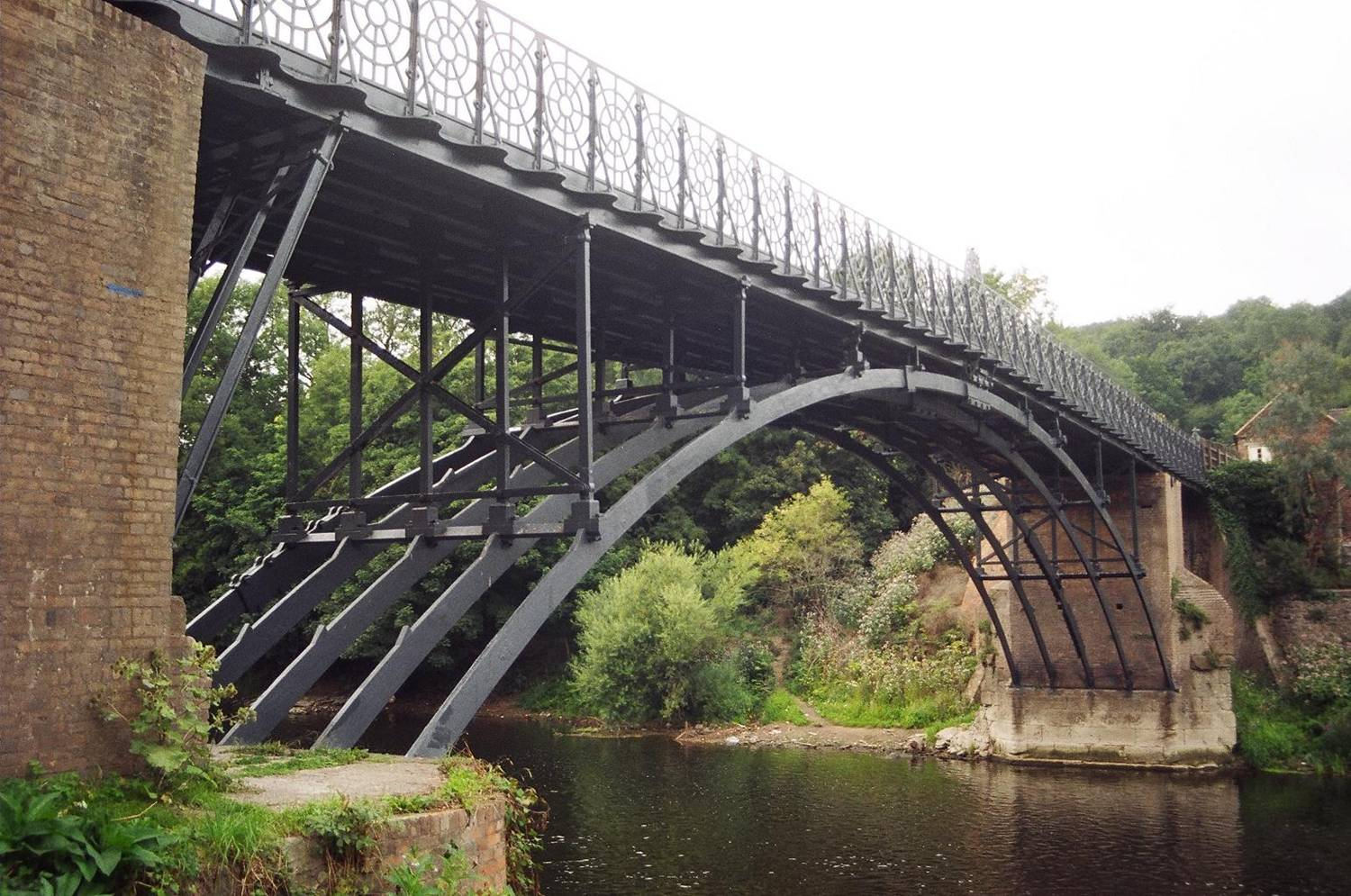
The Coalport Bridge

The Coalport Bridge is a cast iron bridge near Preens Eddy.

It is also directly next to the former Coalport East railway station (Coalport Branch Line) on the Telford side of the bridge and is also a few metres down from the former Coalport West railway station (Severn Valley Railway), which could become a possible extension of the heritage line linking Coalport back onto a railway connection.

== Toll houses ==
A detached Grade II Listed former toll house still sits on the bank of the River Severn, on the High Street, Coalport, by Preens Eddy Bridge. It was originally built as a warehouse between 1793 and 1808, after which it became used as a house by 1815 and as a toll house from 1818. The tolls were collected by the Turnpike Commission trustees, representing the parishes responsible for the upkeep of the Coalport Road; locals used to call it the "catchgate" as it "caught you" to pay the toll. The building still has the original spy holes at each side of the property used by the keeper to look out for people trying to use the road without paying a toll. (Note: An old photograph shows the toll gates adjacent to the property but permission has not yet been sought from the owner to use the photograph copyright in this article.) In 1922, the bridge was freed from tolls but it is believed that even after the cessation of tolls, the still-resident retired toll keeper Mr. Green, and his daughter, continued to protect the restored bridge by dissuading drivers of heavy vehicles from crossing.

According to local historian Ron Miles, there was also a stone riverside toll-house for boats entering the gorge, on the riverside field next to the Severn Valley Way.

== Sport ==
In May 1911, the Sutton Coldfield Automobile Club chose Coalport Hill as the venue for their annual hill climb. A photograph from the Ironbridge Gorge Museum archives shows the start of the race right at the bridge. Six classes of cars and motorcycles competed, and the Wellington Journal and Shrewsbury News announced it would be "a most sporting character … where some thrilling riding should be witnessed."

== Transport links ==
=== Railway station ===
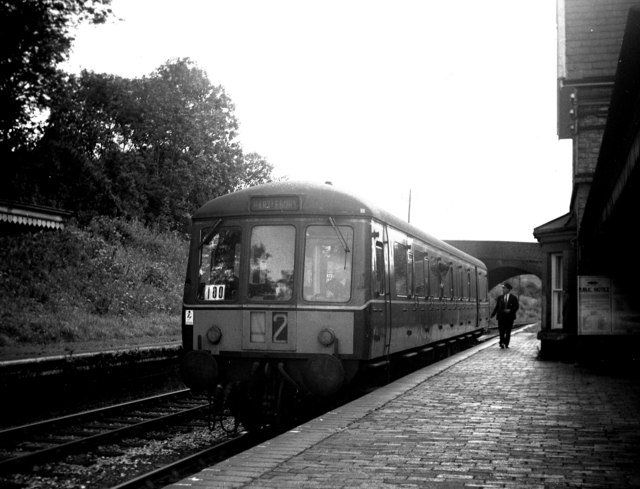
A westbound diesel at Coalport West Station (Preens Eddy) in 1963

Preens Eddy once had its own railway station operated by the GWR known as Coalport Station. To avoid confusion in this article it will be referred to as Coalport West Station because on the other side of Coalport Bridge was another Coalport railway station operated by the LNWR, which will be referred to here as Coalport East Station, now demolished. The station at Preens Eddy still exists, now converted to a private residence with a small portion of the edge of the westbound platform still visible. Since its closure in 1968, the private owners have re-laid a small section of track roughly where the eastbound line would have been. Two GWR railway carriages have been placed upon the track and are rented out as holiday lets.

=== Bus service ===
In 1963, a once-a-day bus was pictured at the Coalport Bridge Terminus. It was operated on Route 938 by Midland Red between Wellington and Coalport via Hadley. Coalport East railway station had already closed in 1958 and once Coalport West (Preens Eddy) closed in 1968 the bus and car remained as the only forms of transport for Coalport, which had originally been well served by rail, road and river transport.

== Public houses at Preens Eddy ==
=== The Woodbridge Inn ===
The only surviving public house in Preens Eddy is the Woodbridge Inn, named after the original "Wood Bridge" that crossed the Severn here. It offers car parking and walkable routes around The Werps, The Tuckies, Jackfield, GWR Severn Valley Way, The Calcutts, The Hay Inclined Plane, Coalport Basin, China works and Tile Museum and Tar Tunnel with five or six pubs en route.

== Historical houses nearby ==
The only sizeable house of historical note appears to be The Amies, a rectangular, black-and-white building of Tudor styling, which was demolished in the 1890s. All that remains today are some depressions in the field and mentions of it in other articles about the larger Tuckies House located about a mile further west. There were numerous private and commercial relationships between inhabitants of The Amies House and The Tuckies House, both of which had significant impacts on land and business ownership in the Broseley, Coalport and Jackfield areas in general, in the 19th century.
