= Listed buildings in Broseley =

Broseley is a market town and civil parish in Shropshire, England. It contains 37 listed buildings that are recorded in the National Heritage List for England. Of these, four are listed at Grade II*, the middle of the three grades, and the others are at Grade II, the lowest grade. The parish contains the town of Broseley, the village of Jackfield, and the surrounding countryside. It was in the 18th and early 19th centuries a centre for coal mining, then ironworking, but there are no significant survivors from this. In the later 19th century a tile making factory was established at Jackfield, and much of it survives as the Jackfield Tile Museum, many of its buildings being listed. In the town there is a former clay pipe factory which is listed. Otherwise, most of the listed buildings are houses, and the others include a farmhouse, a former hotel, public houses, a former butcher's shop, a former toll house, a church, and a war memorial.

== Key ==
Grade	Criteria
II*	Particularly important buildings of more than special interest
II	Buildings of national importance and special interest

== Buildings ==
Name and location	Photograph	Date	Notes	Grade
Woodhouse Farmhouse; 52.61811°N 2.46342°W	—	Early 17th century	The earliest part is a timber framed and brick wing. The main part dates from the mid-18th century, it is in red brick, and has two storeys and an attic. A later porch and kitchen wing have been added to the left.	II
20–22 Church Street; 52.61102°N 2.47855°W	—	1663	Originally one house, later divided into three cottages, it is in red brick with a tile roof. It is at right angles to the road, and has two storeys and an attic. The windows are modern casements, and in the centre is a gable containing a round window.	II
The Tuckies; 52.61923°N 2.45724°W	—	Late 17th century	A house in red brick incorporating stone from an earlier house, and with a tile roof. It has two storeys and an attic, and an E-shaped plan, with a central porch and projecting gabled wings. The front has seven bays, and contains a doorway with a moulded surround. In the attic are four gabled dormers, and to the south are early 19th-century cast iron railings.	II
33 Coalport Road; 52.61002°N 2.47157°W	—	Late 17th or early 18th century	A timber framed cottage with rendered brick infill and a tile roof. It has one storey and an attic, two bays, and 19th-century lean-tos on both ends.	II
Hurstlea; 52.61560°N 2.48537°W	—	1709	A red brick house with brick quoins and a dentilled eaves cornice. There are two storeys and an attic, the ground floor projecting forward, and three bays. In the centre is a Doric portico and a doorway with a moulded surround. The windows are sashes, those in the upper floor with stepped lintels, and in the attic are gabled dormers.	II
Former Cumberland Hotel; 52.61548°N 2.48594°W	—	Early 18th century	Originally a house, later used as a hotel, it has been extended at the rear. It is in red brick, the extensions in brown brick, and has tiled roofs. The main range has two storeys and projecting gables at both ends, and there is a smaller central gable. The entrance has a porch with a four-centred arched head, and above the door is a fanlight. Most of the windows are sashes.	II
Whitehall; 52.61044°N 2.47729°W		Early 18th century	A red brick house with end pilasters, a moulded stone eaves cornice, and a parapet. There are three storeys and five bays, and a recessed two-storey two-bay wing on the right. The doorway is stuccoed with fluted pilasters, a triglyph frieze, and a pediment. Flanking the doorway are two-bay bay windows, and the windows are sashes with channelled keyblocks and lintels. In front is a wall with pilasters and piers.	II
The Lawns; 52.60977°N 2.47690°W	—	1727	A red brick house with quoins, three storeys and five bays. A three-storey bow window occupiers the three left bays. The other windows are sashes with segmental heads, keyblocks and aprons. It was the home of the ironmaster John Wilkinson.	II*
Broseley Hall; 52.61065°N 2.47630°W		Early to mid 18th century	A red brick house with stone dressings, quoins, and a brick parapet. There are three storeys and five bays, and a double-depth plan. The central doorway has a stuccoed surround, a rectangular fanlight, and a curved pediment. The windows are sashes with keyblocks and channelled lintels. At the rear is a staircase window.	II
4 Barratts Hill; 52.61517°N 2.48793°W	—	1741	A brick house with a tile roof, one storey and an attic, two bays, and a lean-to on the left. The central doorway and the windows, which are two-light casements, have segmental heads, those in the attic in gabled dormers.	II
1 High Street; 52.61455°N 2.48665°W	—	Mid 18th century	A brick house with coved eaves and a tile roof. There are two storeys and attics, and three bays. The doorway has a moulded surround, a rectangular fanlight, and a moulded cornice. The windows are sashes with arched lintels, and fluted keyblocks, those in the upper floor also having aprons. In the attic are three gabled dormers.	II
29 High Street; 52.61373°N 2.48412°W	—	Mid 18th century	A red brick house with bands and brick eaves. It has three storeys, and the outer parts consist of three-storey canted bay windows containing sashes. In the centre is a doorway with pilasters, a rectangular fanlight and a cornice hood on consoles.	II
37 and 37A High Street; 52.61369°N 2.48365°W	—	Mid 18th century	A house and a shop, rendered, with bands and tile roofs. The house, at right angles to the road, has two storeys and an attic, three bays, and a lower cross-wing projecting to the right. On the front is a lean-to porch, and the windows are sashes. The shop faces the road, it has a single storey and is gabled. On the side is a casement window, and on the front is a 19th-century shop front that has a central recessed door, a panelled dado, two-light shop windows with arched heads, a moulded frieze and a cornice.	II
The former Crown Public House; 52.61378°N 2.48393°W		Mid 18th century	The public house is in brick with a band, brick eaves, and a tile roof. There are two storeys and six bays. The doorway has a moulded surround, and the windows are sashes with decorative keystones. On the front is a wrought iron sign bracket.	II
32 and 33 Church Street; 52.61120°N 2.47922°W	—	Late 18th century	A pair of red brick houses with corbelled eaves, and a tile roof with coped gables. They have two storeys and attics, and four bays. The windows are sashes with plain lintels and moulded keyblocks, those in No. 32 also having three lights and mullions. The doorways have moulded surrounds with pilasters and cornice hoods, and that of No. 33 also having a rectangular fanlight.	II
51 and 52 High Street; 52.61326°N 2.48306°W	—	Late 18th century	A red brick house with corbelled eaves, three storeys and three bays. The central doorway has a round-headed arch with a keyblock and a fanlight. To its left is a 19th-century shop window, above which is a Venetian window. The other windows are sashes.	II
Willey Furnace Cottages; 52.60223°N 2.48255°W	—	Late 18th century	A pair of workers' cottages later combined into a single dwelling, the building is in red brick with a tile roof. There is one storey, a basement and attics. The windows are casements, and there are two gabled dormers.	II
Woodbridge Inn; 52.61507°N 2.44136°W		Late 18th century	The public house is rendered and has a slate roof with coped gables. It has three storeys and three bays. There is a central doorway with a gabled hood, flanked by canted bay windows. In the upper floors are casement windows with cambered heads.	II
53 and 54 High Street; 52.61318°N 2.48295°W	—	c. 1800	A pair of Regency houses in red brick with dentilled eaves, three storeys, and five bays. In the centre are two doorways with stuccoed surrounds, fluted pilasters, square fanlights, and an overall moulded cornice. The windows are sashes with moulded lintels and decorative keyblocks.	II
Angel House; 52.61414°N 2.48507°W	—	c. 1800	A red brick house in Regency style, with brick eaves, two storeys, three bays, and a single-storey wing to the left. Each bay has an arched recess. The central bay contains a round-headed doorway with a stuccoed surround, a fanlight, and an open pediment on clustered shafts, and above it is a sash window with a segmental head and ornate tracery. The outer bays contain three-light sash windows with keyblocks and channelled lintels.	II
Former butcher's shop, King Street; 52.61780°N 2.48687°W	—	Late 18th or early 19th century	The small former shop is in brick faced with glazed decorative tiles. There is one storey and one bay, a shop window to the left and a doorway to the right, both with cambered heads. Above the shop window is the name of the former butcher in mosaic, and the interior walls are also lined in glazed and encaustic tiles.	II
15–18 Barratts Hill; 52.61463°N 2.48693°W	—	Early 19th century	A row of four red brick houses with brick eaves and a tile roof. No. 15 has two storeys and two bays, and the other houses have three storeys and one bay each; No. 16 also has a basement. The windows are sashes with channelled lintels. Nos. 17 and 18 each has a stuccoed Tuscan doorcase with a pediment.	II
19 Barratts Hill; 52.61460°N 2.48681°W	—	Early 19th century	A brick house with dentilled eaves, a tile roof, one storey and attics. On the front facing Barratts Hill is a large multi-paned window and a casement window to the right. In the attic are two casement windows under gables. The doorway is on the front facing Chapel Lane, and has a doorway that has a moulded surround with pilasters and a small hood on consoles.	II
31 Church Street; 52.61134°N 2.47934°W	—	Early 19th century	An office with Gothic features, later converted into a cottage, it is in red brick on a cast iron frame, and has a pyramidal tile roof with a ball finial and a weathervane. The cottage has a square plan, two storeys and two bays, and a central doorway with a hood on ornamental brackets. The windows have pointed arched heads with keyblocks.	II
42 Church Street; 52.61151°N 2.48006°W	—	Early 19th century	The house probably has an 18th-century core. It is in red brick with dentil eaves and a tile roof. There are two storeys, two bays, and a single-bay extension to the right. The central doorway has pilasters, a rectangular fanlight, and a small cornice hood on consoles. In front are iron railings and a gate.	II
22 King Street; 52.61769°N 2.48689°W	—	Early 19th century	A stuccoed house with dentilled eaves, parapeted gables, and a tile roof. It has three storeys and three bays. The doorway has a moulded surround with pilasters and a cornice hood. The windows in the lower two floors are mullioned and transomed, with plain lintels and keyblocks, and the windows in the top floor are mullioned. To the right is a two-storey coach house with an elliptical headed archway, a row of detached keyblocks, and above them is a circular opening.	II
Bank House; 52.61390°N 2.48452°W		Early 19th century	A house, later used for other purposes, it is in red brick. There are three storeys, a main block of three bays, and a single-bay wing to the left. In the main block, the outer bays contain three-storey bow windows. In the centre bay is a round-headed doorway that has a moulded surround, a fanlight, and an open pediment. The windows are sashes.	II
Broseley Lodge; 52.60645°N 2.47830°W		Early 19th century	The lodge at the entrance to Willeypark Wood is in stone with a slate roof, and has a single storey. Facing the drive are two gables with ornamental bargeboards and spike finials, and between them is a recessed porch with four fluted columns, The windows have Gothick cast iron lights and hood moulds, and the chimney stacks are tall and ornamental. At the rear is a gabled porch with two columns.	II
The Dunge; 52.60400°N 2.47705°W	—	Early 19th century	A red brick house with dentilled eaves and a tile roof. It has two storeys and two bays. The doorway has a moulded surround with pilasters, a segmental fanlight, and an open pediment. The windows are sashes.	II
Willey Toll House; 52.60274°N 2.48281°W		Early 19th century	The former toll house was extended later in the 19th century. It is in red brick, partly stuccoed, on a plinth, with one storey, a basement and a tile roof. The main part has an octagonal plan, a band, and an embattled parapet. It contains a Tudor arched doorway, arched windows, and has a pyramidal roof with a tall central chimney stack. To the right is an extension with a window and a basement outshut.	II
Former clay pipe works and kiln 52.61706°N 2.48648°W		Early to mid 19th century	This consists of two parallel ranges with L-shaped plans. They are in red brick with corbeled eaves and tiled roofs. The range facing the street has three storeys, casement windows and segmental-headed doorway, and a two-storey wing to the left with sash windows. Adjacent to the rear range is a bottle kiln.	II
All Saints Church; 52.61066°N 2.47568°W		1843–45	The church is built in brown Highley sandstone, and is in Perpendicular style. It consists of a nave with a clerestory, north and south aisles, a south porch, a chancel, and a west tower. The tower has four stages, a south doorway, clock faces, and a pierced and embattled parapet.	II*
Conservation workshop, Jackfield Tile Museum; 52.62312°N 2.46361°W	—	c. 1874	The workshop is in mottled brick with a roof of coated tiled and corrugated sheet. It has one storey, a rectangular plan, and an outshut to the north. The workshop contains casement windows, various doorways, and a roof light.	II
Front block, Jackfield Tile Museum; 52.62362°N 2.46481°W		1874	The building is in plum coloured brick with red brick dressings and a tile roof, and is in High Victorian Gothic style. It has an L-shaped plan, with two storeys, three bays at the front, a rear left wing with seven bays, and a tower with a spire at the angle. The front wing contains a through-entry with an iron lintel. The windows are of varying types, including sashes, casements and dormers, and most have decorative tiles in the tympani.	II*
Workshop buildings, Jackfield Tile Museum; 52.6234°N 2.4640°W		1874	A group of former workshop buildings serving various purposes. They are in plum coloured brick with red brick dressings and roofs of tile and corrugated sheet. They include a Tile Press Shop with two storeys and 20 bays, to the south is a Kiln House with one storey and three bays, and to the east is a clay storage building known as the Clay Arks, with one storey and ten bays. To the side of this, and joined by a wooden bridge is the Blunging House with three storeys, four bays and extensions. There is an outbuilding containing a Lancashire boiler.	II*
Disused workshop, Jackfield Tile Museum; 52.62321°N 2.46415°W	—	Late 19th century	The disused tile workshop is in brick with a tile roof. It has two storeys and nine bays, and contains various openings.	II
War memorial 52.61235°N 2.48197°W		1921	The war memorial stands in a triangular garden at a road junction. It is in Cornish granite, and has a stepped octagonal base, and a square plinth with a splayed decorative top. On this is a tapering octagonal shaft that has a hexagonal cornice with floral carving, and a Latin cross. On the plinth is an inscription and the names of those lost in the First World War. On the base are plaques with the names of those lost in the Second World War and later conflicts.	II
