= Craven Dunnill =

English ceramic tile manufacturer

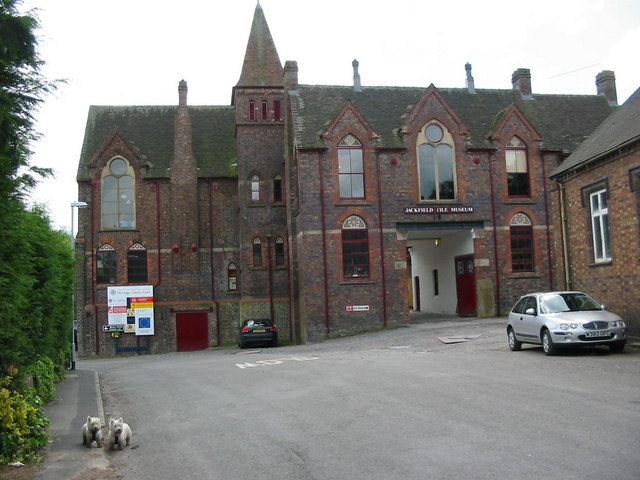
Craven Dunnill's Jackfield tileworks building, now Jackfield Tile Museum.

Craven Dunnill & Co. Ltd. (formerly Hargreaves & Craven, then Hargreaves, Craven Dunnill & Co.) was formed on 9 February 1872, by Yorkshire businessman Henry Powell Dunnill (1821–95), at Jackfield, Shropshire, England. The firm was to become one of Britain's leading producers of ceramic tiles.

== Expansion ==
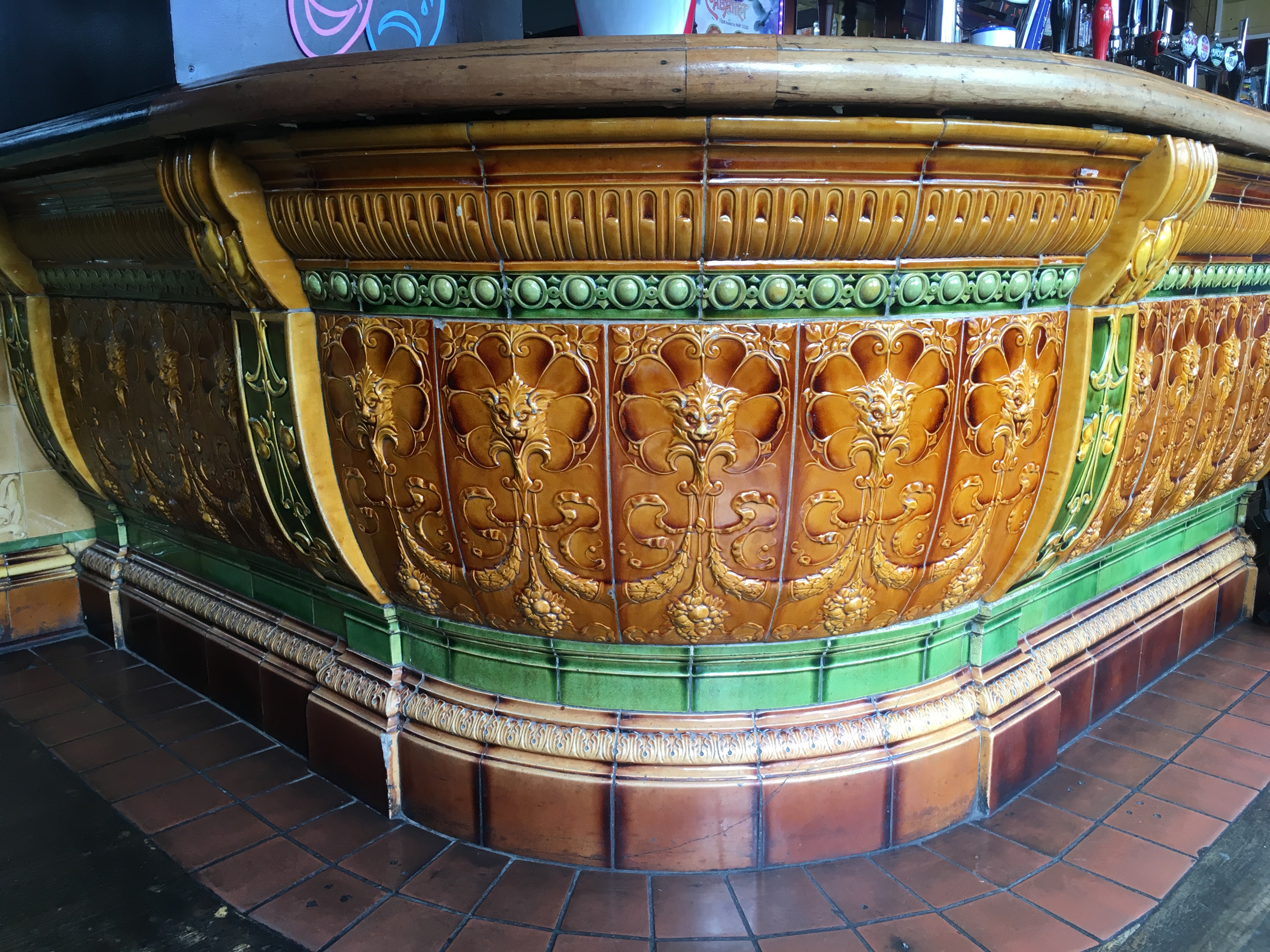
Original, early 20th century, Craven Dunnill tiles on the bar of the Golden Cross pub in Cardiff

Initially based in old buildings in Jackfield, the firm relocated to a nearby new factory, known as the 'Jackfield Works', on 25 February 1874 (grid reference SJ 686029). Designed by Charles Lynam (1829–1921), an architect from Leek, Staffordshire who specialized in industrial buildings and also worked on Croxden Abbey, Craven Dunnill's Jackfield Works was constructed in the Gothic Revival style with a characteristic 'long and thin' plan, enabling raw clay to enter at one end, and finished products to emerge at the other. Lynam was the architect of two other 19th century Victorian era tile works – those of Mintons Ltd of Stoke-on-Trent and Hollins, Staffordshire (built 1869), and Maw & Co., Jackfield, (built 1883).

Craven Dunnill became well known for its encaustic tiles, in imitation of medieval originals. Decorated with inlaid patterns of different-coloured clays, Craven Dunnill encaustic tiles were extensively used for church tiling schemes, from parish churches (such as Kemberton church, in Shropshire) to cathedrals (Chester Cathedral and Shrewsbury Cathedral, for example). The firm also made decorative mosaic, photographic, painted, lustre, transfer-printed, and relief-moulded tiles. A small quantity of art pottery was produced by Craven Dunnill, decorated with relief-moulded patterns and lustre glazes.

Craven Dunnill moved to Bridgnorth, Shropshire as a tile distribution company after tile production ceased at their Jackfield Works in 1951.

The historic Jackfield Works site was acquired by the Ironbridge Gorge Museum Trust in 1983, and part of it is now managed as the Jackfield Tile Museum, one of many museums operated by the Trust.

Craven Dunnill returned to the site as Craven Dunnill Jackfield Ltd in 2000, reviving the manufacture of commercial tiles there after a gap of around fifty years. A multi-million pound business in 2012, Craven Dunnill Jackfield Limited's specialist team manufacture decorative wall and floor tiles using traditional Victorian methods. The company produces tiles for a UK and worldwide market including the US, Australia, New Zealand, Europe and the Middle East. Craven Dunnill at Bridgnorth remains a tile distribution company and the company's administrative head office.

Some parts of the factory and a weekly guided tour are open to visitors of the on-site Jackfield Tile Museum.

The Craven Dunnill Encaustic Tile Works are a waypoint on the South Telford Heritage Trail.

More recently Craven Dunnill Jackfield were responsible for restoring the flooring of the Central Lobby of the House of Commons, relaying 60,000 tiles following the original design of Augustus Welby Pugin. The final tile was laid in April 2021 concluding a nine-year long project.

== See also ==
- encaustic tile

== Sources ==
The Jackfield Decorative Tile Industry, Tony Herbert (Ironbridge: Ironbridge Gorge Museum Trust, 1978)
Pottery and Tiles of the Severn Valley, Michael Messenger (London: Remploy, 1979: ISBN 0-7066-0732-5)
Journal of the Tiles & Architectural Ceramics Society, Vol 4, 1992 (ISSN 0264-5157)
