= Panot =

Type of outdoor tile

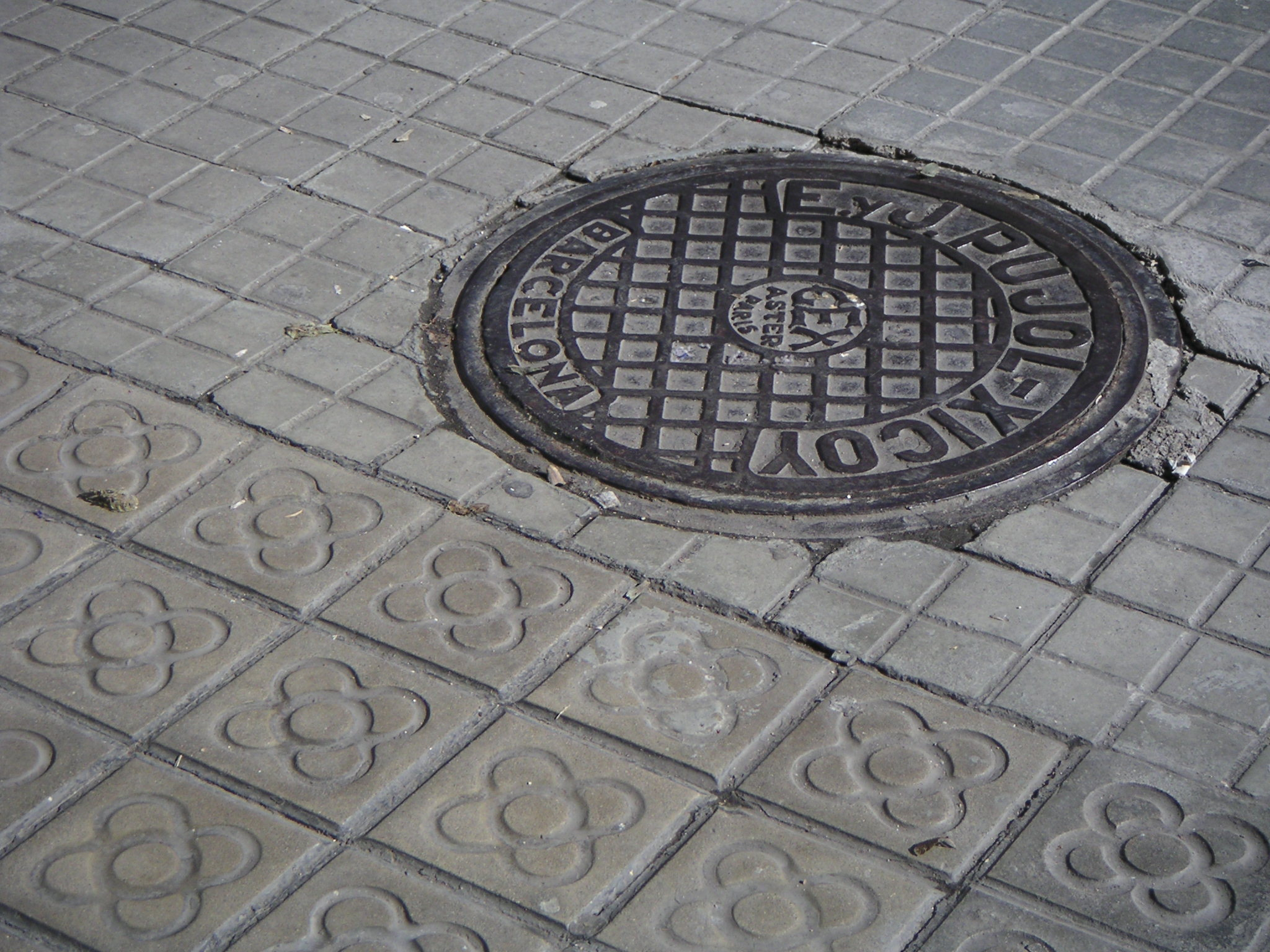
Two designs of panot paving Barcelona; the flor de Barcelona in the lower corner is the most common and iconic.

Panot (transl. flagstone) is a type of outdoor cement tile and the associated paving style, both found in Barcelona. Panot tiles are usually small and square, and feature graphic designs pertaining to the neighbourhoods of the city which they pave. The panot tiles designed by Antoni Gaudí are hexagonal.

== Etymology ==
The name panot derives from the French panneau, specifically the purpose that refers to cement slabs.

== History ==
Barcelona began paving its streets in the 17th century, and by the end of the 18th century this was closely regulated. Streets – for both vehicular and pedestrian usage – were paved with cobblestones. Up to the modern day, several of Barcelona's vehicle roads are cobbled. As the city experienced the Modernisme movement and rapid expansion, paving tiles with artistic as well as practical function began to be used, including mosaic pavement designed by Pere Falqués on the Passeig de Lluís Companys for the 1888 Barcelona Universal Exposition. Interior flooring had once used small terracotta tiles, but in the late 19th century also developed, with many buildings using ceramic tiles.

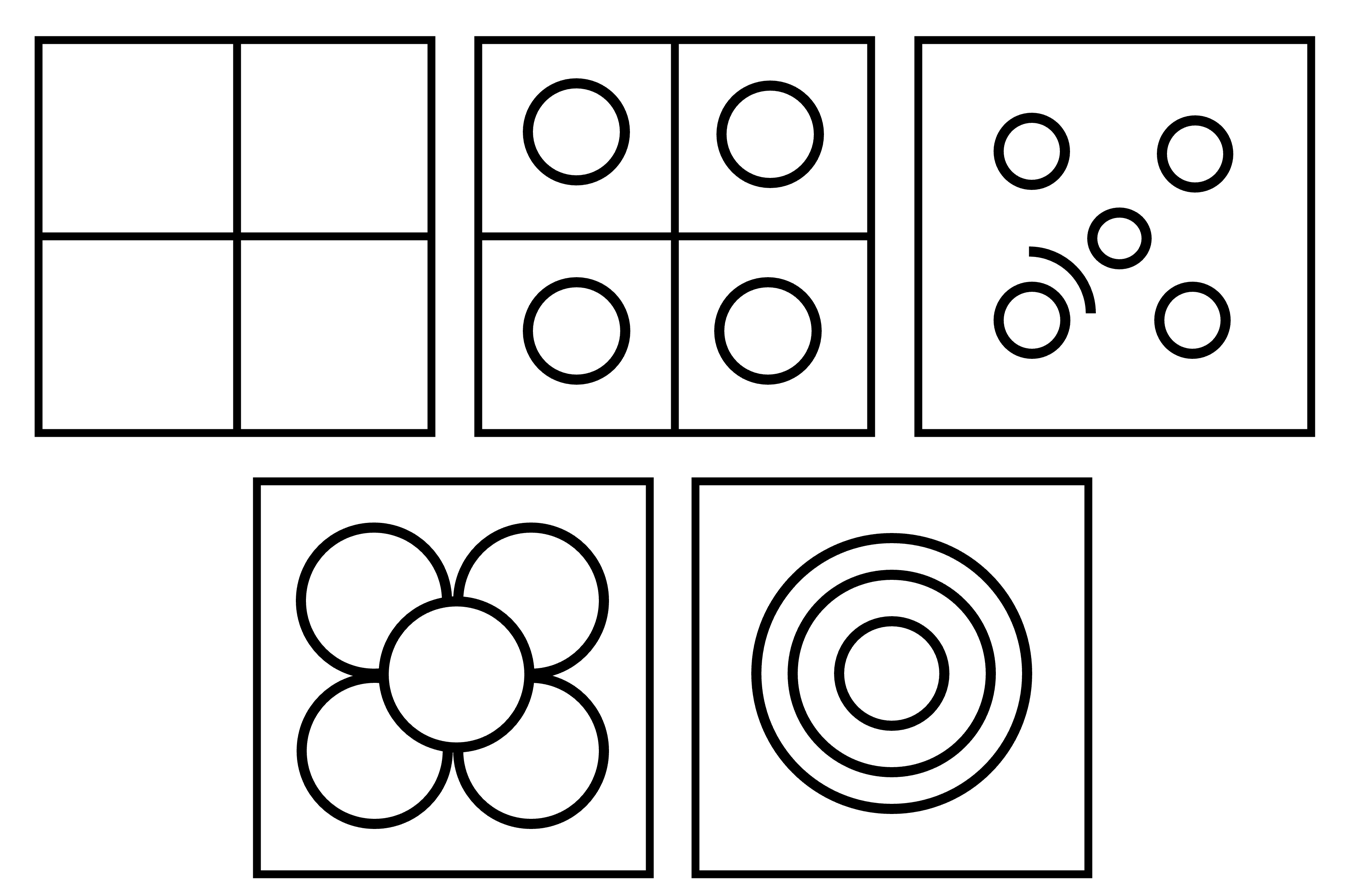
The five original chosen designs

Until the early 20th century, paving the street outside of private properties was the responsibility of the owners, but the material was prescribed by the city: expensive Montjuïc stone. Residents could apply for construction permits if they wanted to use other materials; with some adhering and others not paving due to the cost, the streets of Eixample were uneven and messy. In 1891, paving company Escofet became the first to offer outdoor panot tiles as an alternative, and as early as 1895 had asked for the city to approve use of such tiles en masse. In 1906 the city decided to take over the process and tendered for 18 tile designs and production of 10,000 m^{2} (110,000 sq ft) of tiles (without specifying dimensions of individual tiles). To make the project affordable, the city opted to use cheap hydraulic cement tiles, which some residents had already done; at the time, Catalonia was a big cement producer, including for artistic purposes, with the industry seeking to expand. Following complaints from the industry that 18 was too many designs to produce, the city chose five designs. A few of these were labeled with street names, so may have already been in use in those locations.

The tender was won by Ramon Escober, who was awarded 42,000 pesetas and gave the production rights to Escofet. In 2010, around 5,000,000 m^{2} (54,000,000 sq ft) of Barcelona streets were panot tiled.

== Designs ==
=== Flor de Barcelona ===
For many years it was commonly believed that the Flor de Barcelona was a design by Catalan architect Josep Puig i Cadafalch, the same as used in floor tiles for the Casa Amatller, with visual differences in the two attributed to the wear experienced by the Casa Amatller tiles. Restoration of the building in 2013 and historical document research published in 2018 revealed that the Flor de Barcelona design was not recorded before the 1906 tender; it may have been in use by some individuals before then, but was not Puig i Cadalfach's, in which a deep relief four-leaf design is completely chiseled out of the stone (rather than a flower shallowly outlined). The nature of the Casa Amatller's tiles being inside allowed for such a design, which would accumulate rainwater if outside like the flor de Barcelona panot. The research suggested that the flor de Barcelona may be inspired by the Casa Amatller tiles, but with practical differences and no documentation, the design cannot be attributed to Puig i Cadalfach.

The Flor de Barcelona panot is particularly widespread and has become a symbol of Barcelona, including as a popular tattoo design.

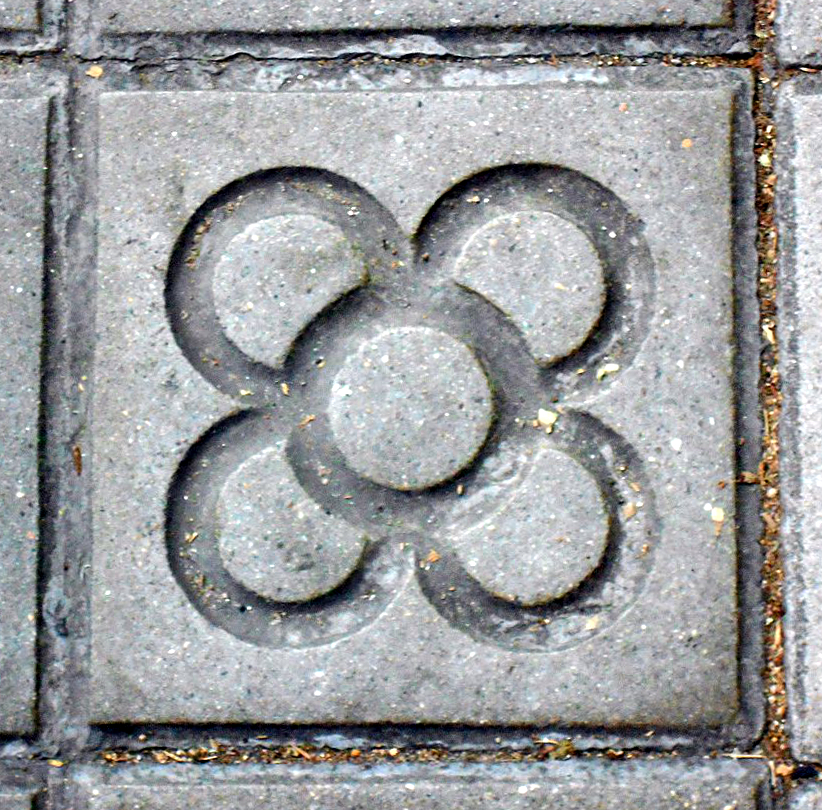
Flor de Barcelona design

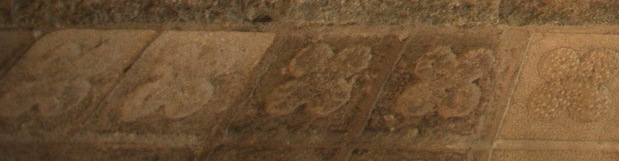
Casa Amatller tiles

=== Panot Gaudí ===
Catalan architect Antoni Gaudí used ceramic tiles in his building designs, as was the custom, until realising that cement tiles could be used for interiors and provided options for design in art and colour. Gaudí designed tiles for the Casa Batlló; due to the complexity of the design, producer Escofet could not deliver them on time and they were instead installed in the Casa Milà; the original tiles were produced between 1905 and 1907. As Gaudí had created other flooring for the Casa Milà (namely an also-hexagonal parquet of oak and poplar), the tiles were only laid in less important rooms.

Gaudí's tiles (panot Gaudí) evoke the underwater world. They are hexagonal and originally a shade of nephrite green, with three design features on each that align with adjacent tiles to create a larger image. The designs on the original tiles are in shallow relief, and may only be visible when the tiles are illuminated.

In 1997, Barcelona paid homage to the popular design by paving the pedestrian street of Passeig de Gràcia (both the Casa Batlló and Casa Milà are on this street) with a more weather-resistant version. The Museum of Modern Art in New York contains a group of Gaudí tiles from the Casa Milà.

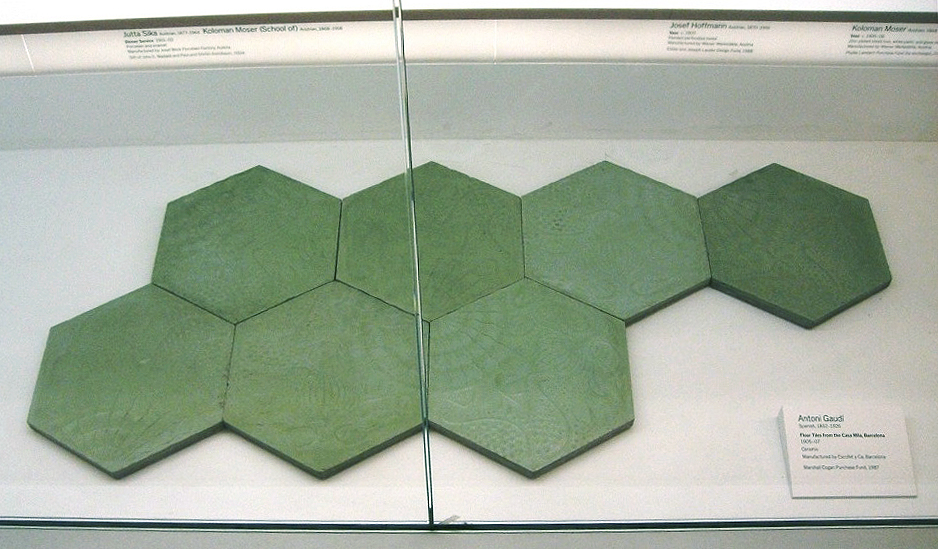
Original Casa Milà tiles on display at MoMA

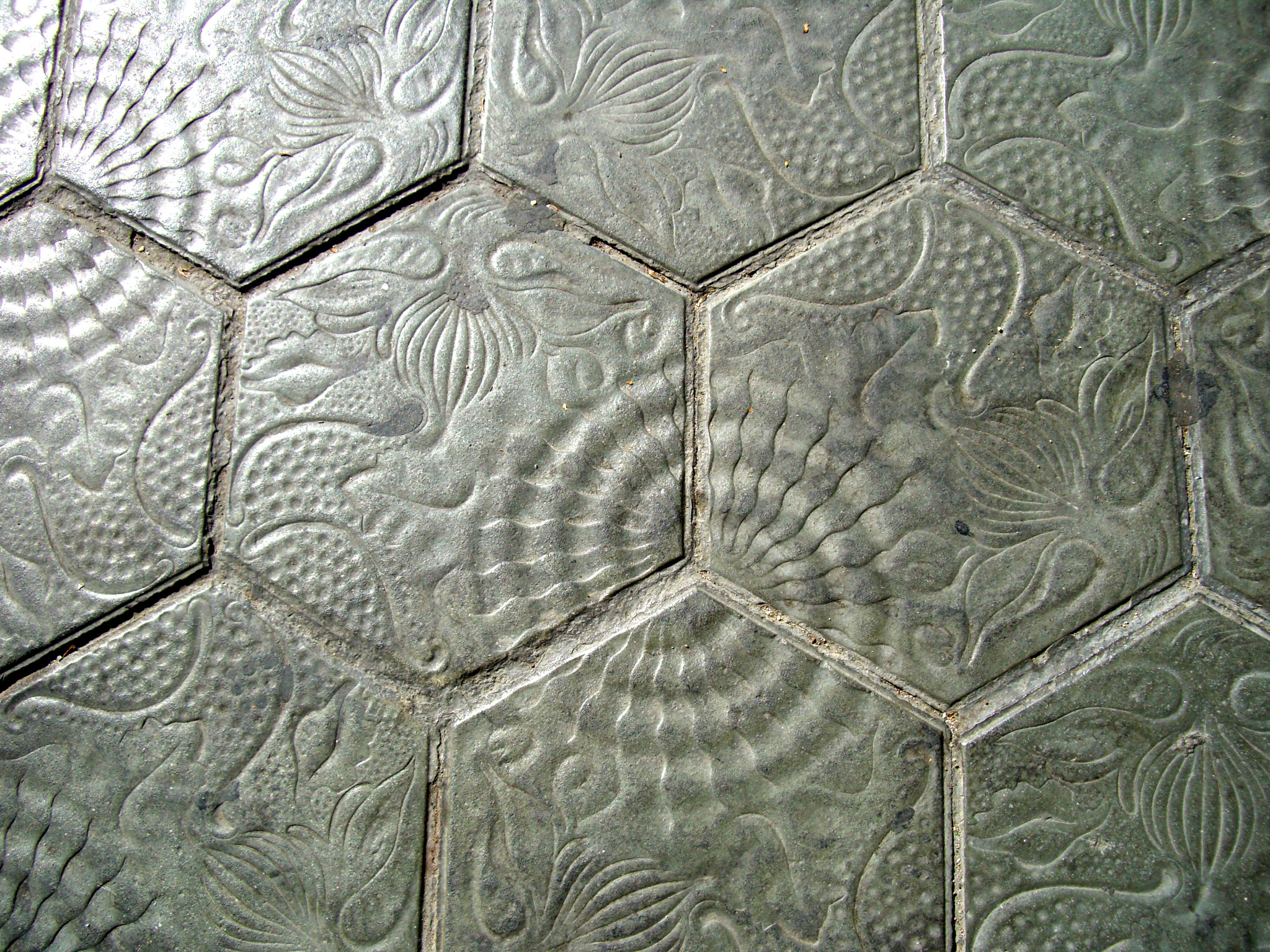
Gaudí panot tiles

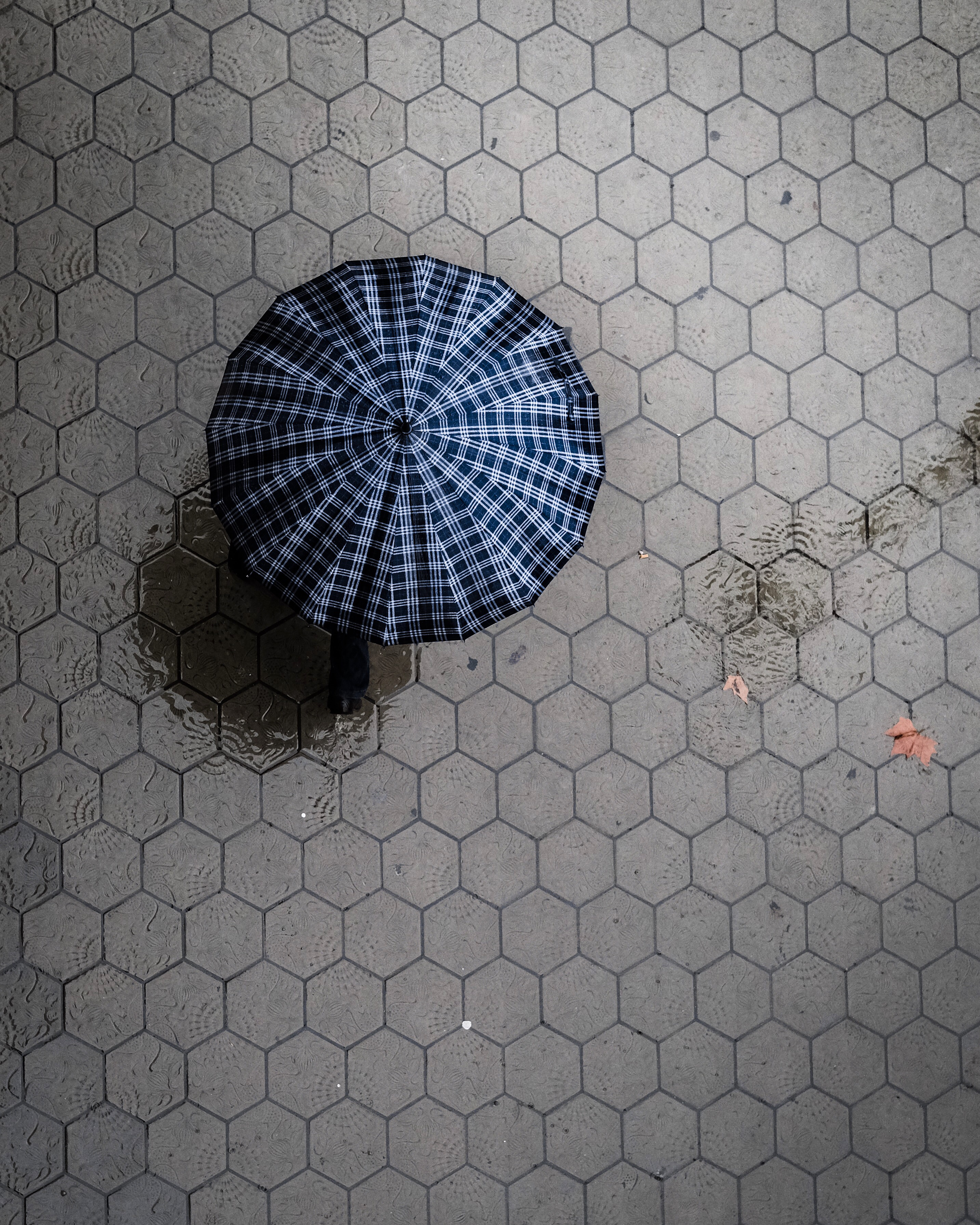
Passeig de Gràcia from above

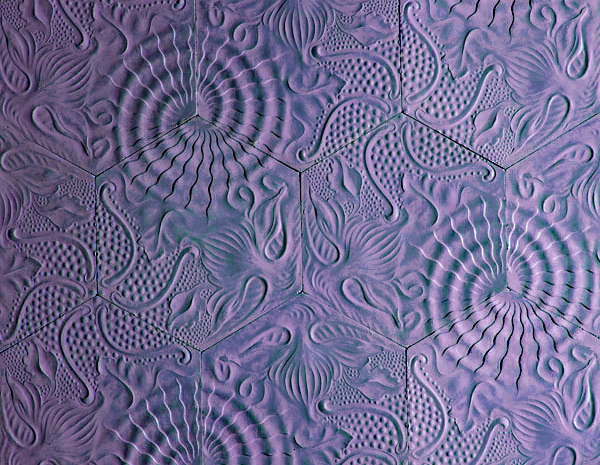
Three full designs can be seen when multiple tiles are laid in a certain pattern.

=== Others ===
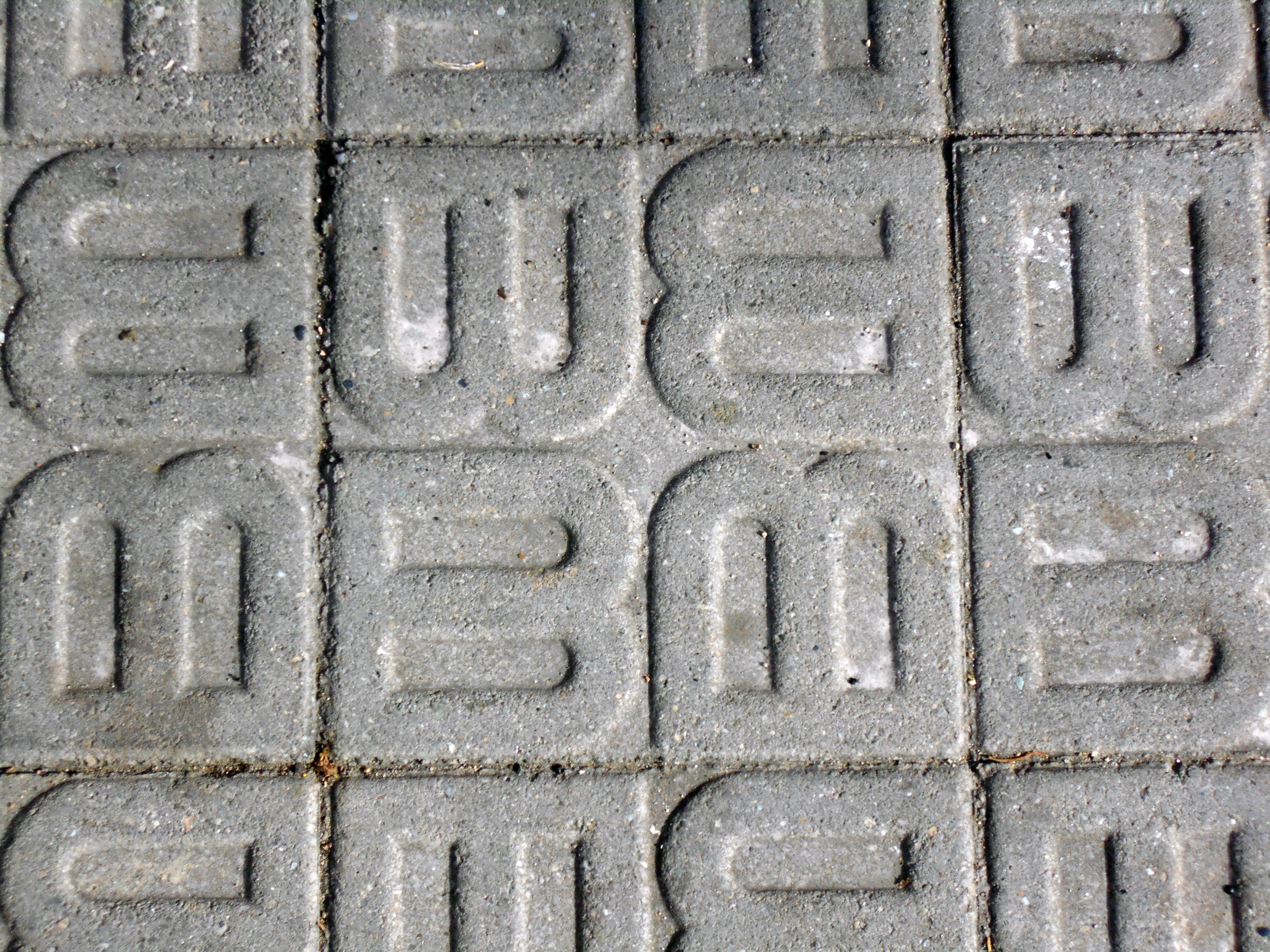
"B for Barcelona" design

In 2008, a "B for Barcelona" design was introduced on one street, being limited in usage due to its unpopularity. A new panot was used in 2015, on Avinguda Diagonal. The banana leaf design was also initially unpopular, with people saying it was uncomfortable to walk on; it was replaced after six months, but with the same design, only replaced because of so many broken tiles.

== See also ==
- Encaustic tile
- Portuguese pavement
- Tile art
- Urban planning of Barcelona
