= Jackfield =

Village in Shropshire, England

Coordinates: 52.623°N 2.465°W

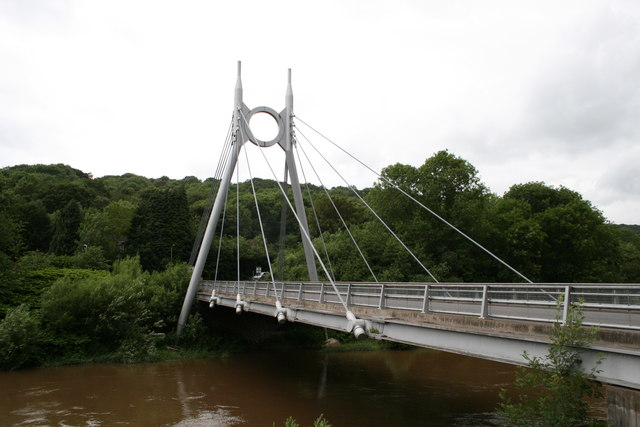
- Jackfield Free Bridge, spanning the Severn, linking Jackfield with Ironbridge

- Location within Shropshire
- OS grid reference: SJ685029
- Civil parish: The Gorge; Broseley
- Unitary authority: Telford and Wrekin; Shropshire
- Ceremonial county: Shropshire
- Region: West Midlands
- Country: England
- Sovereign state: United Kingdom
- Post town: TELFORD
- Postcode district: TF8
- Dialling code: 01952
- Police: West Mercia
- Fire: Shropshire
- Ambulance: West Midlands
- UK Parliament: Telford; Ludlow

Jackfield is a village in the Telford and Wrekin borough of Shropshire, England, lying on the south bank of River Severn in the Ironbridge Gorge, downstream from Ironbridge. Like many of the settlements in the area, it is notable for its place in the Industrial Revolution.

== History ==
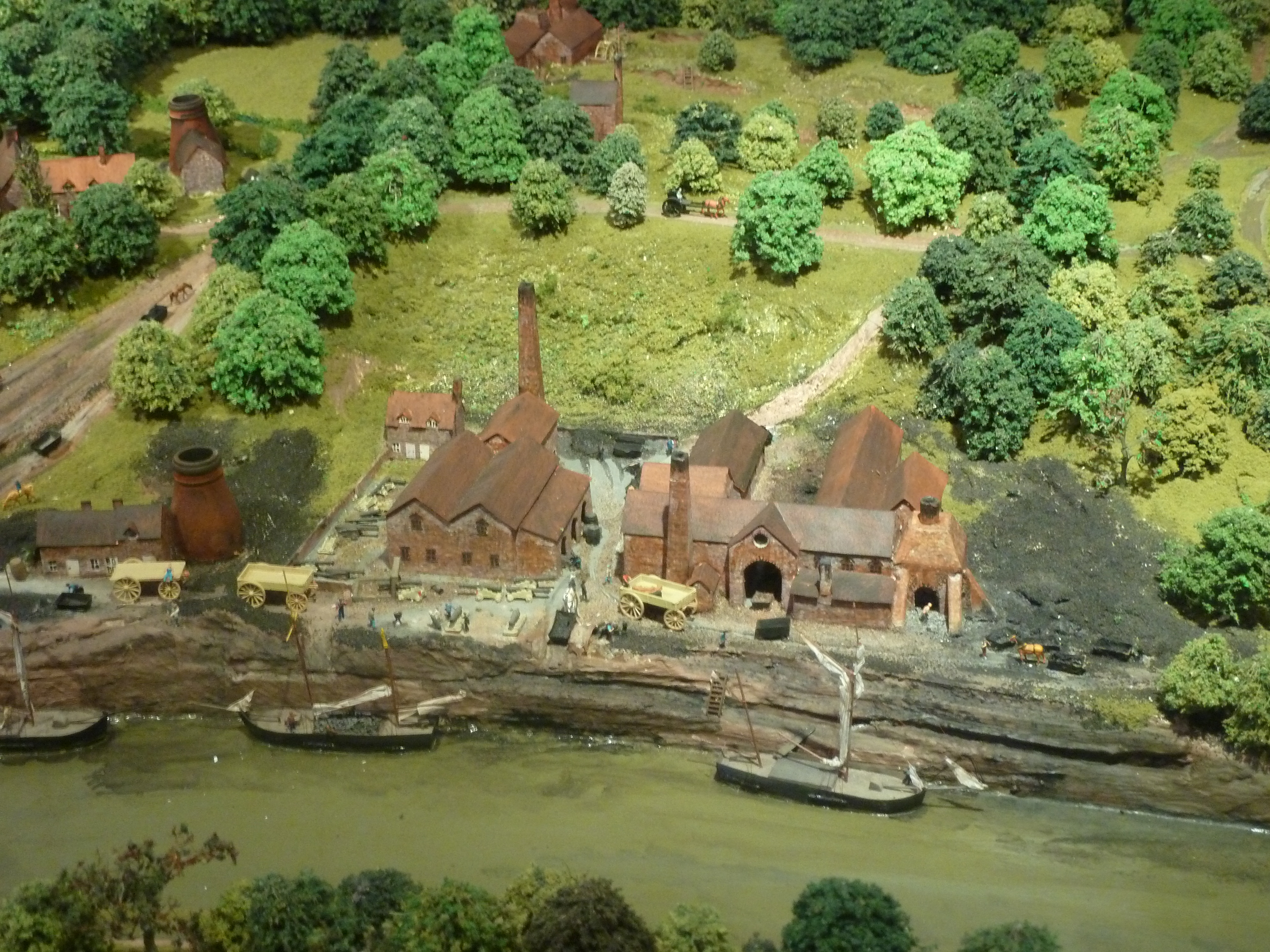
The Calcutts Ironworks – part of a large model of the wider gorge during the Industrial Revolution at the Museum of the Gorge in nearby Ironbridge.

View from the Free bridge down river

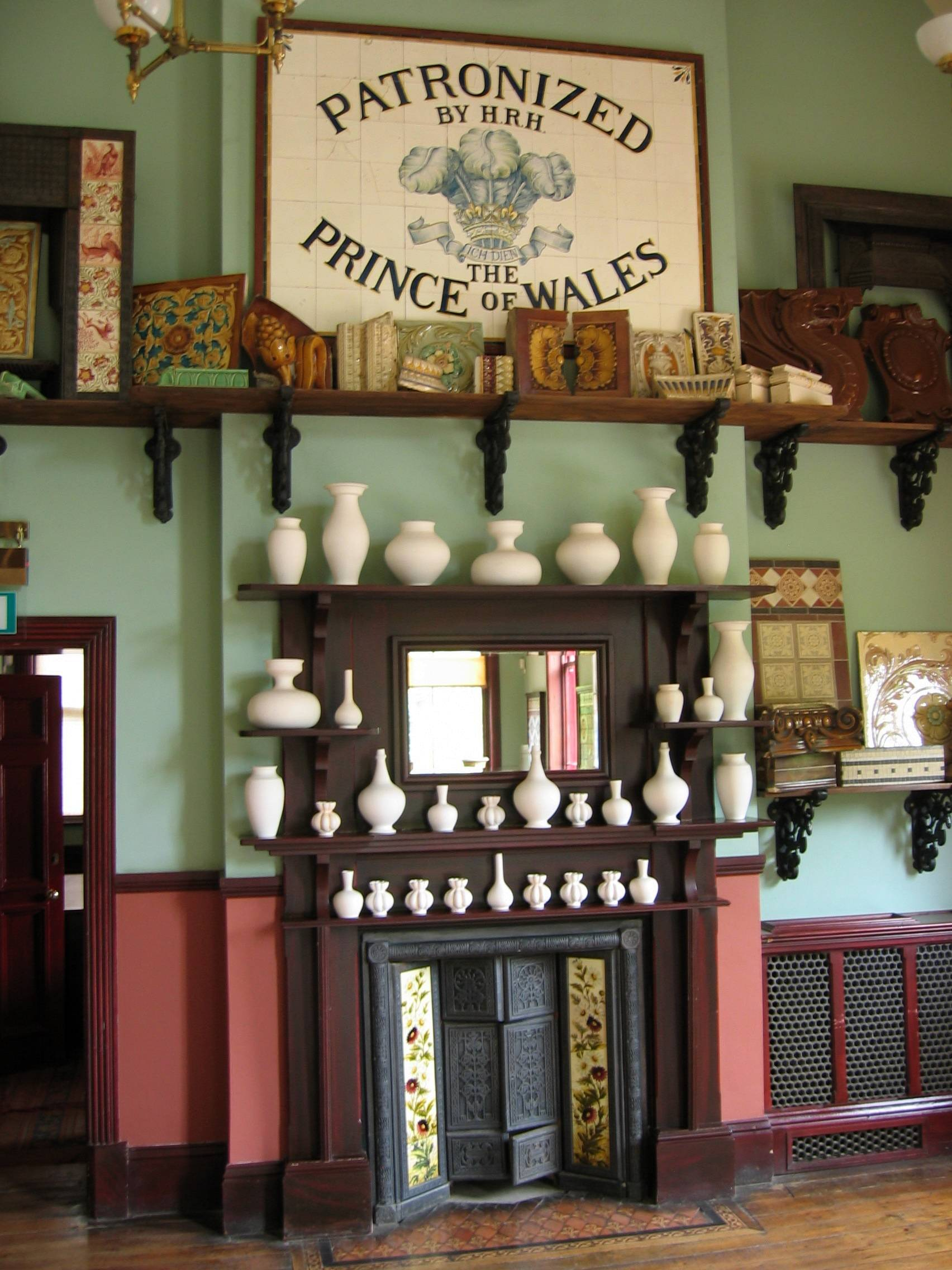
Display of tiling and other ceramics inside the Jackfield Tile Museum.

Jackfield grew as a river port for nearby Broseley and Benthall (which are situated high above the Severn) and is a notable part of the area's famous early industrial activity. The first railway in Shropshire and second in Great Britain was built here – by 1605, the lord of the manor of Broseley, James Clifford, had constructed a wooden railway (usually termed a wagonway) from his coal mines to the river at Jackfield. It has recently been suggested that this is older than the Wollaton Wagonway which is generally thought to be the earliest such wagonway. There was a pottery here from at least 1634 and corn mills existed along the stream that flowed into the river. The wooden railway also followed the route of this stream, which is the valley which Calcutts Road runs down.

The potteries flourished and became known for their drinking mugs produced, and the Thursfield family from Stoke-on-Trent ("the Potteries") arrived in 1713 to set up a pottery here. Their Jackfield Ware (a highly vitrified black earthenware decorated with gold flowers and figures) became famous around the mid-18th century. Manufacture of pottery continued throughout the 19th and 20th centuries, with specialism moving on to the production of tiles, including high quality encaustic tiles, and this manufacture continues today albeit on a small scale (in part to replace Jackfield-made tiles in conservation work, including on the London Underground and the Houses of Parliament). Jackfield Tile Museum is one of the ten museums of the Ironbridge Gorge Museum Trust which in 2026 transferred to the ownership of the National Trust.

For about a hundred years, from 1862 to 1963, the Severn Valley Railway line ran through the area, on its route between Shrewsbury and Bridgnorth. There were sidings to support the several tile works in the area, along with Jackfield Halt for passengers. Little remains of the railway except the unusually large level crossing gates, which spanned sidings as well as the main running line, now the largest surviving in the UK. Some lengths of the trackbed today serve as a vehicle-free route for pedestrians and cyclists.

A major landslip in 1952 devastated a large part of the centre of Jackfield and resulted in some parts of the village (such as between the Tile Museum and Salthouses) being abandoned. 27 cottages were lost in the 1952 landslide, in the Salthouses area, and the river was narrowed by about 15 yards. Separately, the Werps was the most eastern part of Jackfield but had been abandoned by the end of the 1950s.

In late 2013 Telford and Wrekin Council confirmed that government funding had been granted to carry out a stabilisation scheme in the area. The main works for this were completed in October 2016. During these works in 2014 the remains of several houses that were buried in 1952 were uncovered.

== Geography ==
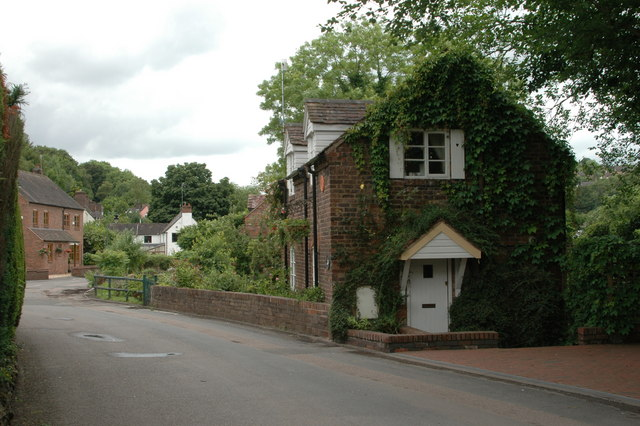
Houses in the west of the village.

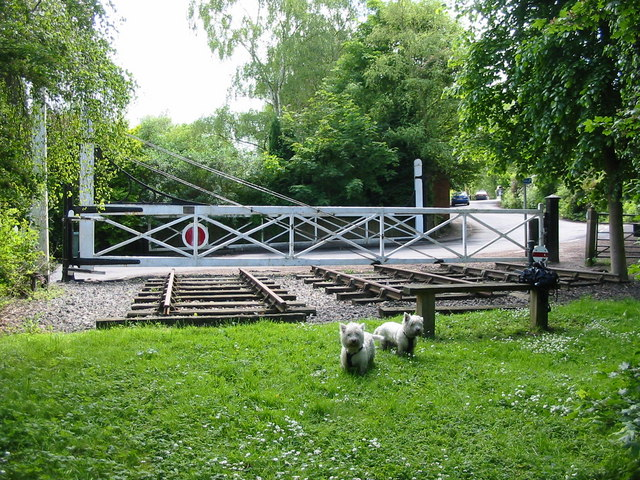
Preserved level crossing gates and railway track at the former Jackfield sidings.

The market town of Broseley is just to the southwest of Jackfield (the town centre being only 1 mile (1.6 km) distant) and on the opposite bank of the Severn is the village of Coalport. Jackfield is in both the Telford and Wrekin Council area and the Shropshire Council District area of Shropshire – the boundary between the two authorities runs through the settlement. The part within Telford and Wrekin forms part of The Gorge civil parish, whilst the remainder is part of Broseley's civil parish. The Gorge Parish Council has its offices and holds its meetings at the Maws Craft Centre in Jackfield.

Jackfield encompasses the largely-linear settlement spread along the steep southern bank of the Severn for approximately 1 mile (1.6 km), from just before the Free Bridge to just after the Memorial Bridge. The village also reaches up the hill, towards Broseley, along Calcutts Road.

The central portion of the village was constructed on a particularly unstable part of the Ironbridge Gorge, where several landslips have been recorded, most famously the landslip of 1952. The hillside is made more unstable by abandoned, flooded mineshafts and tunnels. A major stabilisation project, which included the rebuilding of Salthouse Road on a new alignment, began in 2014 and was completed in October 2016. Flooding also badly affects the lower parts of Jackfield from time to time, including the Boat House pub, which has flood levels recorded on its front door (the highest recorded at the pub being on 1 November 2000).

The eastern part of the settlement consists of the Tuckies and Salthouses. The westernmost part, in the vicinity of Jackfield Free Bridge, is known as Coalford.

== Features ==
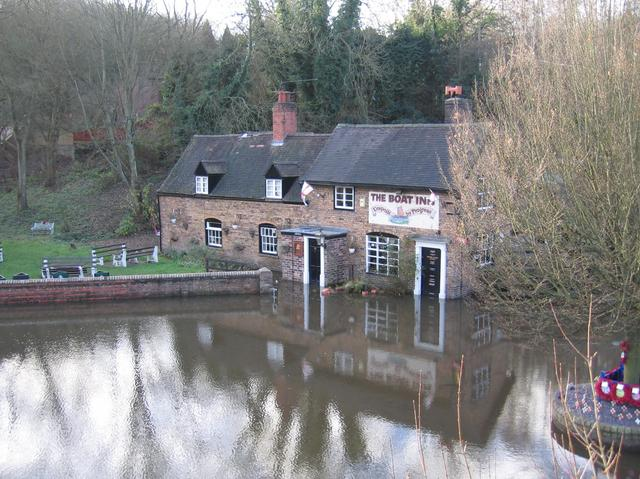
The Boat public house during a flood; notable flood levels are marked on its door.

Less than a mile upstream is the world-famous Iron Bridge. In Jackfield itself, there is the Jackfield Tile Museum, housed within the former Craven Dunnill factory. Tile manufacturing still takes place there today, by the same company albeit on a smaller scale. Today, Craven Dunnill Jackfield manufacture hand made wall and floor tiles in true Victorian fashion. A number of historical sites in Jackfield comprise waypoints on the South Telford Heritage Trail.

The Maws Craft Centre, formerly a part of the area's tile works, is located on Salthouse Road between the Tile Museum and the Memorial Bridge, and houses a large number of small businesses as well as the offices for The Gorge parish council.

There is a village hall for Jackfield, located by the river near the Tile Museum.

=== Bridges ===
Half a mile downstream from the Iron Bridge is Jackfield Free Bridge, carrying the B4373 road. The old Jackfield Free Bridge was built in 1909 by local subscription to avoid tolls on the Iron Bridge and Coalport Bridge further downstream. It gave trouble in the 1930s and required repeated repairs until in 1993, beyond repair, it was demolished and replaced with the present bridge, built by Alfred McAlpine. The new Jackfield Free Bridge is a striking structure.

The Memorial Bridge is a footbridge spanning the River Severn, linking the Tuckies part of Jackfield with Coalport. It was built with funds raised by public subscription in 1922, and is in memorial to the men of Jackfield and Coalport who were killed in the First World War, later dedicated to those of both World Wars. The original structure was declared unsafe in 1997 but was refurbished and reopened in 2000.

=== Cycling ===
Jackfield is on National Cycle Route 45, named the Mercian Way; it uses the trackbed of the former Severn Valley railway line, which is also popular with walkers, as it is a flat, relatively straight and vehicle-free route through the southern side of the Ironbridge Gorge.

=== Pubs ===
There are three public houses open in Jackfield – the Half Moon (at Salthouses), the Black Swan and the Boat Inn (at the Tuckies).

=== Rapids ===
The Jackfield rapids is a short section of the Severn, as it passes the Black Swan pub at Jackfield, where the river narrows and flows noticeably downhill (the river otherwise flows largely gently through the Ironbridge Gorge). These are popular with kayakers who grade rapids according to how difficult they are to navigate. Those here used to be grade 2, but following bank stabilisation work on the south bank in 2001 has become more difficult and are now grade 3 or 4 in some levels. Further stabilisation work has occurred since on the north bank too, resulting in both banks here being shored by large rocks. There is now a stopper and a difficult wave train for the less experienced.

== See also ==
- Listed buildings in Broseley
- Listed buildings in The Gorge
