= The Tuckies, Jackfield, Shropshire =

The Tuckies
- Location within Shropshire
- OS grid reference: SJ691023
- Civil parish: Broseley
- Unitary authority: Shropshire
- Ceremonial county: Shropshire
- Region: West Midlands
- Country: England
- Sovereign state: United Kingdom
- Post town: TELFORD
- Postcode district: TF8
- Dialling code: 01952
- Police: West Mercia
- Fire: Shropshire
- Ambulance: West Midlands
- UK Parliament: Ludlow

The Tuckies is a hamlet in the eastern part of Jackfield, lying on the south bank of the River Severn, in the Ironbridge Gorge, and opposite the village of Coalport. The purpose of this article is to capture its historical importance during the Industrial Revolution and provide links to the people and culture that once thrived here. The lower part of The Tuckies, in Ferry Road, is still badly affected by flooding and head-height water levels are clearly displayed in a doorway at The Boat Inn where the 1922 memorial footbridge crosses the River Severn to Coalport. The Severn Valley Railway, operated by GWR, ran through The Tuckies and the original railway bridge, now forming part of the Severn Valley Way, still crosses the road there, at OS grid reference 693024.

The boundaries to The Tuckies are not well defined and may be disputed owing to 16th and 17th Century references only pointing towards the Tuckies as being the manor house, which, for the purposes of limiting information in this Encyclopedia entry, will be considered as its southern boundary. However, other references below use "The Tuckies" and "Tuckiesfield" to describe locations extending to the Werps to the east, The River Severn to the north, and Ferry Road which leads to the main part of Jackfield village, to the west.

== Remains of the settlement today ==
A late 19th Century photograph pictures a row of 5 cottages at the Tuckies together with The Duke of Wellington Inn, its brewhouse and a riverside road running between The Boat Inn and a neighbouring settlement at The Werps, both just off the photograph to the right and the left respectively. Of the 5 cottages pictured, the smallest (leftmost) cottage (originally No.235) was demolished and replaced with a modern garage as part of No 234 (now Puddleduck Cottage) which was also knocked through into what was once 233. Numbers 231 and 232 have also been merged into one (becoming No.231) and so visitors to the picturesque cottages at The Tuckies today can easily be confused by 231 and 234 being next door to one another. Reference in 1851 to the Duke of Wellington being in Tuckiesfield rather than The Tuckies could originate from when Tuckies House, a mansion just south of the settlement, was split apart from it by the coming of the G.W.R. railway (now part of the Severn Valley Way) but this speculation is unproven. Tuckies House is described in more detail in its own sub section.

== Pubs at The Tuckies ==
=== The Duke of Wellington Inn ===
The Tuckies c.1900 showing The Duke of Wellington Inn

Today, residents of The Tuckies are fortunate to have a public house, The Boat Inn, virtually on their doorstep but prior to 1964 they had at least one, even closer. The Duke of Wellington, a prominent building, was located immediately to the left of a row of 5 cottages, shown in the photograph. Prior to its demolition in 1964, it was owned by Banks Brewery, who also owned the neighbouring Boat Inn, but the photograph indicates that the prominent 3-storey Duke of Wellington had its own brewhouse and locals refer to it as having also had a pig sty. Upon demolition, the old cellar was used as a landfill site for the bricks from the old inn and more recently the new landowners have excavated the old bricks and piled them up at the left hand side of the site once occupied by The Duke of Wellington. As of early 2011, the entirety of the old cellar, complete with arch and steps is completely exposed.

In 1922 landlord Ralph Rockingham, who never really recovered from First World War wounds resulting in a foot being amputated, died of a haemorrhage at The Duke of Wellington, aged just 33. A keen bowls player, he had only been there about 3 years and upon his death, his wife Mrs Rockingham then took on the licence[1]. Earlier, in 1910,[2], the Landlord of The Duke of Wellington was recorded as Walter E. Parcel, his wife Mrs Parcel being the landlady and Fanny Kersley being the barmaid. Prior to that, in September 1903, the Duke of Wellington was sold at auction[1] (at the Tontine Hotel, Ironbridge with Barber & Sons as the auctioneers) to the Lichfield Brewery Company for £1,050, plus an extra £40 5s for fixtures. The adjoining piece of land was sold at the same time to Messrs. Maw for £90. The auction followed the death of landlord Mr James Daniel Smith whose funeral was held in Jackfield church by Rev. J. Marsden Edwards (Rector of Jackfield). J.D. Smith had been landlord for at least 6 years owing to his existence in The Wellington Journal back in 1897[3] when it was reported that he had been instructed by the council's surveyor to attend to the nuisance caused by drainage problems with the cellar there. Further back in 1871[4] Matilda Cranage is listed as landlady of the Duke of Wellington Inn, but located at Tuckiesfield rather than The Tuckies. An earlier record, Jackfield in 1851,[5] based on the census returns of that time, show that a John Jones was the innkeeper and that he had a dual occupation, the other as being a China Potter. Samuel Bagshaw, also 1851,[6] possibly confuses records by mentioning the Duke of Wellington as being at the lost village of The Werps although Werps is known to have been further east, along the river bank towards Preens Eddy.

=== Boat Inn ===
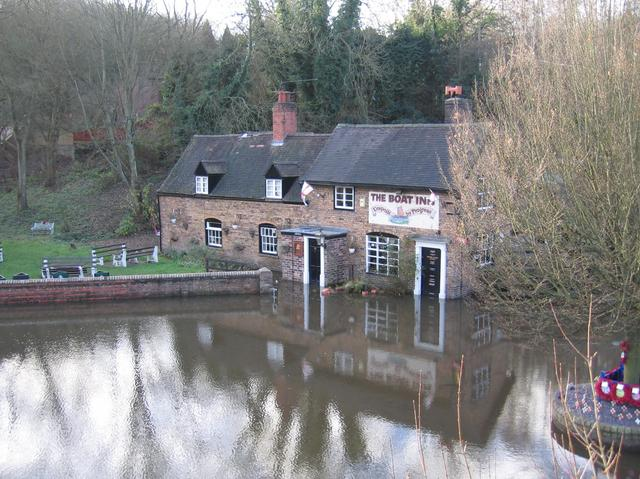
The Boat Inn, flooded in 2006

Bearing the distinctive slogan "Unspoilt by Progress" in large letters painted directly underneath its name sign on the front of the building, The Boat Inn[7] is today, one of only 3 pubs remaining in the Jackfield area, and the only one in the Tuckies part of Jackfield. It regularly floods when river water rises, sometimes almost as high as the entrance door, but peculiarly, the rising water tends to emerge first through its quarry tiled floor as a result of a raised water-table level. This has the effect of opposing the dirty river water rising on the outside and although still destructive, is something that landlords and regular customers have become accustomed to. The Ironbridge Gorge Pub Guide contains a number of photographs of The Boat Inn during times of flood and a 1925 photograph of the footbridge during a time of flooding shows The Boat Inn heavily flooded on the right as well as The Duke of Wellington Inn on the far left behind the telegraph pole, as well as the Brewhouse and old Engine House at higher elevations in the Tuckies. The 1871 trade directory for the Broseley parish [8] lists Amt Oswell as the tradesperson at the Boat Inn as well as being a shopkeeper at Tuckies. The Boat Inn's web site gives more details about the current landlady, Jenny Alexander, as well as regular activities and live music events held in the summer on their outdoor, riverside stage.

These two names appear in a publication called Broseley and its Surroundings[9] by John Randall which lists pubs that ceased to exist in the 60 years up to 1879. It is unclear as to whether these were earlier names for The Boat and/or the Duke of Wellington or if not, what their precise locations were. What the publication does tell us is that a Jno. Challenor was landlord of the Tuckies Inn in the mid 19th Century.

== Tuckies Ferry and Memorial Footbridge ==
Ferry Road takes its name from the Tuckies Ferry (AKA Coalport Ferry) which connected Jackfield with Coalport for 120 years. The ferry ceased to operate when the memorial bridge was constructed by Cleveland Bridge & Engineering Company at a cost of £1,046, taking 9 weeks to build. It links Tuckies (part of Jackfield) at The Boat Inn on the southern bank of the Severn, to Coalport (by the Tar Tunnel) on the northern side. Opened in 1922 it was built as a war memorial to the sons of Jackfield who fell in the First World War. In 2000, the bridge was refurbished after some years of neglect. A 360-degree panoramic view of The Tuckies, Tuckies Lane, The Boat Inn, Ferry Road, the Jackfield Memorial Footbridge, the River Severn and entrance to the road to nearby lost village of Werps (now a footpath), is photographed from roughly the same point as where the old ferry would have crossed the Severn and is available for public viewing below, courtesy of the BBC's website. The old ferry itself can be seen in a separate photograph before the bridge was built. In this picture the Hay Incline Plane is visible in the background and the Tuckies riverbank in the foreground.

In 1799, The Tuckies ferry sank with a great loss of life. See section on "Disasters and serious accidents".

Some speculation exists, as to whether one of the many barges, deliberately sunk in the River between The Werps and Preens Eddy, possibly to minimise the effects of local landslides, could be the remains of the old Ferry. The 9th Journal of the Wilkinson Society, dated 1981, publishes part of a letter from Ron Miles of Jackfield, who wrote in June 1980, that the barges were lying on the river bed directly opposite the Coalport China Works. Miles explained that 25 years previously, he had obtained information from a Mr. George Harrington who was at the time, living at the Tuckies, Jackfield, informing that the barges (which he referred to as "lighters") were filled with stones and rubble and sunk there by the G.W.R. Company. Miles reports to have subsequently taken pictures of them himself when they became visible during a very dry summer in 1958 and had one of the shots and a small article published in the Express and Star that year. He reported measuring one of them and found it to be 35 feet in length and six feet wide.

== Disasters and serious accidents ==
=== Tuckies Ferry Disaster, 1799 ===
On 23 October 1799, the Tuckies Ferry overturned and although water flow at this point is very rapid, the cause of the accident has never been satisfactorily explained. There were forty-one persons on board the vessel, most of whom had just finished at 9pm, at John Rose, & Co. China Works. Of these, thirteen only escaped, the remaining twenty-eight, were all drowned. In the darkness of the night, it was impossible for friends and relations to render effective help at the river bank and many of the bodies were recovered the next morning, at a great distance from the ill-fated spot; some remained under water a month, and a few were never found.

=== Tuckies ferryman drowned 1900 ===
On 20 January 1900, Mr. John Harrison, aged 72, who has had charge of the ferry-boat between the Tuckies and Coalport China Works for over 20 years, was in the act of lighting his lamp on the boat when he fell backwards into the river (witnessed by school teacher Jane Ellen Blocksidge) and was swept away by the swollen waters (witnessed by Henry Wild, boatman), only to be discovered 41 days later, badly decomposed in the Severn at Bridgnorth[17].

=== Landslide disaster, 1952 ===
The instability of land in the area led to a giant landslide in 1952 which destroyed many houses and commercial properties near the centre of Jackfield itself, about one third of a mile upstream from The Tuckies. Video footage of the aftermath effects on Jackfield in general, are captured in a video newsreel film preview at http://www.britishpathe.com/record.php?id=60102. However it is not clear if there was any direct impact on properties or people in the Tuckies settlement itself. Maps contained within "A Geological Trail through the landslides of Ironbridge Gorge" show the landslide zone extending through the area on which The Tuckies resides together with underlying rock structure, photographs and the positions of some disused mine shafts which contribute in part to the landslip problems of the area.

== Recorded crime ==
In 1910, Albert Perks, labourer and William Taylor, clerk, both of Jackfield, were charged with being on the licensed premises of the Duke of Wellington Inn, Jackfield, during prohibited hours. This was after police-constable Reeves had been standing at the bottom of the Tuckies Road, from about 11pm one evening until about midnight, monitoring activity at the Duke of Wellington Inn, while the landlord himself was away. At their trial, at which police-constable Edwards and George Cox also gave evidence for the successful prosecution, the good characters of the defendants, Perks and Taylor, determined that they would not be convicted, but would be bound over to be of good behaviour for a period of 12 months. They were also ordered to pay the costs.

In a separate trial, associated with the above case, Walter E. Parcel, landlord of the Duke of Wellington Inn, Jackfield, was then charged with allowing intoxicating liquor to be consumed on his premises during prohibited hours, even though he was away at the time and while Mrs Parcel and Fanny Kersley were providing the service. The defendant, Walter Parcel was found guilty and fined £3 17 shillings, including costs.

The Boat Inn, The Tuckies, Jackfield, was the location of an assault in 1937, when Frank Taylor, an iron moulder from neighbouring settlement, The Werps, threw an ashtray at labourer, Ralph Roberts, from No.8, The Lloyds, Iron-Bridge who had been talking with Harry Balmforth from Coalport. Taylor was fined a total of 15 shillings including costs.

== Bowling greens ==
The Duke of Wellington had its own Bowling Club. The light patch of grass shown at front of the Duke of Wellington in the photograph above, indicates that a bowling green did exist on the premises, land that in 2011, is private and belongs to the owners of 234 Tuckies Hill. The Wellington Journal & Shrewsbury News, 1929[18], reports that The Duke of Wellington were runners-up to The Lord Hill in the Broseley Bowling Association Championship that year, the awards ceremony taking place at its headquarters, the King's Head, on 1 November. At the 1933 annual meeting, it was stated that the club would again compete in the Madeley Amateur Bowling League and in addition to the usual cup competition, an extra cup, to be won outright during the 1933 season would be played for. Names involved with the club at the time included Mr. J. Cox (captain), Mr. J. Cleobury (vice captain), Mr. H. Jones (Hon. Sec) with Mr. J. G. Bradley taking the place of Mr. W. Hallony on the committee.

The Boat Inn also had a bowling club indicating the likelihood of a green there too. At its 1938 annual meeting, the club was shown with a balance 19s. 6d and persons involved included:— Mr. P. Preece (chairman), Mr. E. Hodge (Secretary and Treasurer), Mr. L. Stephen (Captain), Mr. IX Pritchard (Vice-Captain), Mr. W. Storey (Auditor), Messrs. W. Hatton, R. George, J. Hammond, H. Burton, A. Cleobury, L. Stephen and D. Pritchard (committee members).[20]

== Tuckies House ==
The Tuckies, an old mansion, stands (52°37′09″N 2°27′26″W) on slopes rising from the southern bank of the river Severn, opposite Coalport. It is shown on a map, "Brosely in 1620" and in the early 19th Century it was described as a small yet valuable estate, containing coal mines which are far from being exhausted though they have been worked at different periods, for the last two centuries. Apart from discussing the peculiar nature of the stratum of coal found here, the reference goes on to say that much iron is made on this side of the river at the furnaces belonging to Messrs. Hazledine of Shrewsbury, and Messrs. Forster.

The Tuckies belonged to the descendants of William Langley, younger son of William Langley from nearby manor, the Amies (c. 1500). After the Langleys, the estate went to the Purcells but after 1741, the estate was gradually sold piecemeal thereafter. In 1787 the house was leased to Archibald Cochrane, 9th Earl of Dundonald, and in 1800 to his associate and fellow industrialist William Reynolds, and it was probably at that time that a balcony (later removed) was added to the front of the house to command the magnificent views over the Severn Gorge. Shortly before 1860 the Tuckies was divided into 'two respectable dwelling houses'; it was perhaps then that alterations were made including refenestration, remodelling of the main staircase and some of the interior, and extension of the second storey over the east front in an overhang. In 1863 it was bought by Lord Forester and later still, the house was divided into three tenements.

The Earl of Dundonald, (father of the then Lord Cochrane) who resided here a considerable time, undertook chemical experiments, among the principal of which, was that of extracting tar from coals. For this purpose many kilns or ovens were erected and the reference describes in some detail how the process was conducted. It is stated that great quantities of this useful article were sent for the use of the navy, and much of it was used in japanning. Dundonald expended large sums of money in these undertakings was said to thoroughly understood both the theory and the practice of the science, yet have a cheerful and benevolent disposition.

In Pigot's Trade Directory of 1822, Bryan and Martin, are listed as trading coal from Tuckies-House. Mrs Bryan was known to have taken part ownership of part of the estate c1820 but it is not clear as to what extent.

== Mining, industry and other trades ==
Large-scale mining dated from the 1570s. In 1575 James Clifford, was found to have dumped large amounts of spoil into the Severn from a pit near the Tuckies. The riverside settlement for this part of Jackfield probably grew up at the same time. The 1952 landslide where many houses fell into the river was said to have been caused by a combination of collapsed workings from the nearby old Tuckies Mine clay workings and unstable slopes (Brown, 1975). Tuckies Red Clay and Coal Mine had two shafts; one was 7 ft in diameter and 195 ft deep and the other was 6 feet in diameter and 210 feet deep. The mine was ventilated by 'exhaust steam' from pipes in the upcast shaft

At the Tuckies, an engine pump was installed about 1780 to drain several mines including Boat Leasow Mine. The Tuckies engine house still survives at 214 Tuckies Hill, although converted into a dwelling in the 1840s with an adjoining house added in the 1880s. During alterations in 1983, the joists of the first floor were found to have curved cut-outs in the middle where they had once supported the steam cylinder. The second floor joists were very thick and had obviously been the original beam floor, with the one end wall about 3 ft thick that had supported the engine's beam. The 150 ft deep pumping shaft was still open at the time, although covered with a concrete slab and a garden shed.

A disused "shaft" is shown on an old map indicating the site of the old coal mine at Tuckies House.

Industrial railway lines other than the G.W.R. line, included one of the earlier 18th century which ran west of Corbatch dingle to the Tuckies, and one which in 1827 ran along the riverside and connected several lines running to the river from the area east of Jackfield.

The 1871 trade directory for the Broseley parish in borough of Wenlock lists John Doughty from The Tuckies, as a brick, tile, and crest manufacturer, as well as being a barge owner.

Gas came to The Tuckies in 1927 in the form of a gas-lamp placed at the junction of Ferry Road, Tuckies Hill and Werps Road. It was put there free of charge by the Broseley Gas Company, Mr. Hayward Davis reporting that it was a very good light.
