= The Werps =

Lost English village

Coordinates: 52°37′06″N 2°27′08″W

The lost village of Werps was one of a group of small settlements which later became collectively known as Jackfield in the Broseley Parish in Shropshire. The Werps lay on the south side of the river Severn, opposite the Old Coalport China Works (now a youth hostel) and records indicate either three or four public houses, although it is unclear as to whether any of their names are renames of the same building or whether re-built on the same site.

== Location ==
The boundaries of The Werps are not well defined, but for the purposes of limiting information in this encyclopedia entry, the River Severn will be considered as its northern boundary, The Tuckies where Werpsfield met the land on which The Duke of Wellington public house once stood as its western boundary, Preens Eddy its eastern boundary and what was the GWR railway line (now The Severn Way footpath), its southern boundary.

== Pubs at The Werps ==
=== The Werps Inn, later renamed The General Gordon ===
Thomas Beard, a Broseley born man, was not only the long-time landlord of this pub but he was also the Master of a freight-carrying trow, named the 'William', sailing up and down the river Severn. When on his voyages, his wife Mary Ann (Vaughan), a native of Guilsfield, Montgomeryshire, held the reins as can be seen in the 1851 Census. In the 1861 census Thomas is in charge and also in 1871 according to Casey's Trade Directory of 1871. In 1881 and 1891, Thomas is found in Gloucester and Stourport on his trow and with his wife having died in 1874, it is unclear who was in charge of the pub at that time. In the 1901 census, and on his death in 1902, Thomas (known as "Owner Beard") it was stated again that he was Landlord but by then the pub was known as the 'General Gordon'. The 1883 Ordnance Survey map shows the pub as 'Werps Inn' but the 1901 OS map gives the same building as the 'General Gordon Inn'. It is possible that the name change was prompted by the death of British General Charles George Gordon during the Siege of Khartoum in 1885. The information plaque on the quayside at Bridgnorth shows an illustration of Thomas Beard and George Stephan (with others) aboard the 'William' – it is based on a photograph of the trow and its crew at Coalport.

The General Gordon was the last of the pubs in Werps and located quite far back from the river bank. Thomas Beard was its landlord, as well as a bargeowner, until his death in 1902, aged 84. During Beard's time there, the pub was known to have a Quoits Alley thought to be popular with the English quoits champion (see "sport" section). The next landlord was to be Thomas Beard's grandson, George Stephan, whose 4-year-old daughter met with tragedy at the General Gordon Inn one Monday morning in November 1904. During the momentary absence of the mother, the child's clothing caught fire, and she died from the effects of the burns and shock. This was a case of history repeating itself as George's twin brother Eustace died, at the same age of 4 years, in the same circumstances back in 1870. The 1911 census shows that George Stephan had retired and the resident Licensed Victualler was then 28-year-old Emily Hammond, living there with her husband William and two children. The Ordnance Survey maps of The Werps still marks it as an inn in 1927. Tragedy was to strike the General Gordon again though. In 1937 Charles Herbert Morris, a Shropshire County Council roadman, aged 52, was killed in a road accident in Madeley. In an extract from the Wellington Journal & Shrewsbury News, 1937, his address was stated as the "General Gordon (formerly a licensed house), Werps Road", indicating that The General Gordon had ceased to be a pub before this 1937 accident.

=== The Ship Inn ===
In 1779 Ann Adams was listed as the landlady at The Ship Inn, Werps, and one hundred years later, in an 1879 list, it was detailed as one of those inns and beer houses which had ceased to exist during the last 60 years. At the time, "Jno. Jones" was named as The Ship's landlord. No indication exists of its exact location though its name suggests a riverside one.

=== The Britannia Inn ===
Also listed as a pub that ceased to exist sometime in the mid 19th century, was the Britannia Inn, with Susan Oswell as its landlady but again no indication of its location has been given or whether it was an earlier name for one of the other public houses.

== Industry and business ==
River trade was a source of great revenue in the 18th and 19th centuries, serving the needs of the iron, china and coal mining industries along the banks of the Severn, and The Werps Ferry, just downstream of The Tuckies Ferry provided a crossing point between Coalport China works and Tuckies Mine. The Beard family were extensively involved in trade on the Severn since 1706 when the first Thomas Beard, owned a mid-sized trow and a small barge worth £60. In 1724 the Coalbrookdale Company accounts show a Eustace Beard carrying for them who subsequently became one of their most trusted contractors. The Beard family continued to work barges on the river until the very end of the navigation, and Thomas Beard of Jackfield was the author of a book detailing the lives of the barge-owning community.

The "William" was a well-known Severn Trow operating near The Werps and is pictured at http://www.walktelfordheritage.co.uk/site.asp?SiteRef=25&DataTypeRef=photo&DataRef=9 clearly showing that it was built at or near Broseley. Ron Miles of Jackfield in 1980 wrote that "William" was the last barge and was photographed at the Werps just above the General Gordon pub.

Miles also refers to a discussion with a Mr. Harrington some 25 years earlier when he was informed that many barges (Harrington referred to them as "lighters") were filled with stones and rubble and deliberately sunk between The Werps and Preens Eddy, directly opposite the Coalport China Works, possibly to minimise the effects of local landslides. Miles reports to have subsequently taken pictures of them himself when they became visible during a very dry summer in 1958 and had one of the shots and a small article published in the Express and Star that year. He reported measuring one of them and found it to be 35 feet in length and six feet wide.

Other businesses are also known to have existed at The Werps, although details are scarce. Edwards Williams had a dual profession there as both a shopkeeper and a brick/tile maker, according to Casey in 1871.

== Sport ==
The General Gordon is known to have had a Quoits Alley and it is probably one of the locations which took part in the Coalport Cup in the early 20th century. The Coalport cup, pictured on the table at IGCA's website http://www.igca.co.uk/interesting-people-from-the-gorge/mike-evans/, was commissioned to commemorate Mike Evans (real name William Evans) becoming the English Quoit champion, on 17 October 1901, using a 19 lb quoit, in Peterborough.

== Crime ==
=== Theft ===
Samuel Langford, a miner with an address at General Gordon Inn, The Werps, was charged with stealing a piece of timber valued at 3d. the property of the Madeley Wood Co., Ltd., He was fined a total of 35 shillings, including costs.

=== Assault ===
In 1897, Henry Jones, a labourer from Broseley, was charged with assaulting John Oswell, a 70-year-old labourer who lived at the Werps, Jackfield. Having thrown him in the hedge and said, "Lie there, you old sod", the defendant ran away and Bench were of opinion that the assault was a dastardly one, and sentenced defendant to 21 days' hard labour, and a further seven days if the costs were not paid.

=== Cycling offence ===
In 1938, Albert Edward Harper, a bricklayer from The Werps was fined 5 shillings. for failing to conform to a "Halt" sign at Waterloo Street, Ironbridge, on 16 July. Although claiming to have been riding a bicycle for 30 years with a clean record, his solicitor entered a guilty plea.

== People ==
In 1862 the Reverend Henry Lee became the rector of Jackfield (including Coalford, Lloyds Head, Jackfield, The Werps) and eventually proved to be the longest serving of all the rectors there.

In 1901 the Sneyed family lived in The Werps. George (father) was employed as a bricklayer, and with Edith they had a son, Arthur (aged 1) and daughter Ethel (aged 2). On 4 November 1918, Private Arthur Sneyed was killed while fighting in World War I, aged 19. On 3 November 1920, Sergeant Arthur Reynolds, (King's Liverpool Regiment) of 252 Werps Road and husband of Nellie, died aged 49.

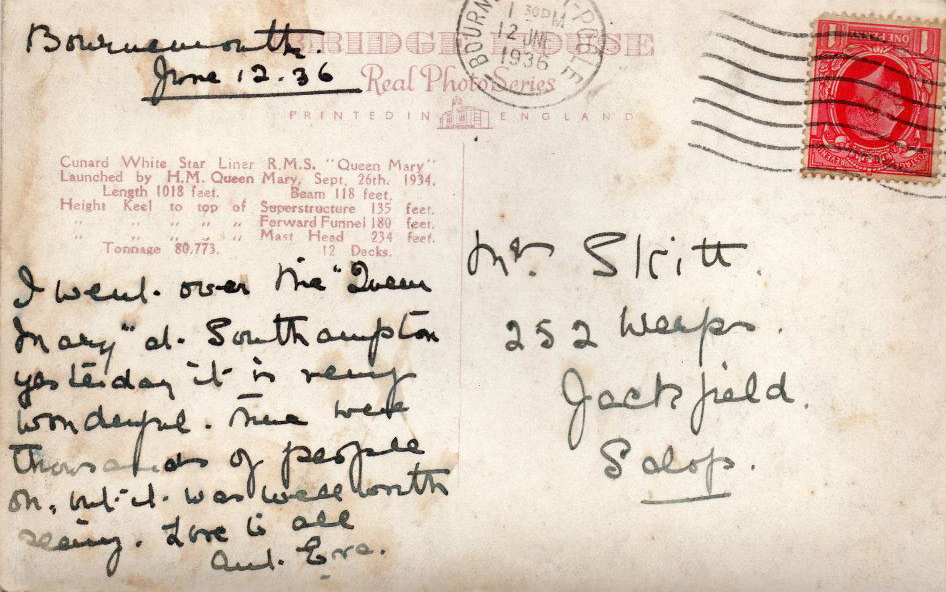
1936 postcard addressed to 252 Werps Road

In July 1927, Edith Ellen Elizabeth Bradley, aged just 16, died at the residence of her grandparents, 244, Werps Road.

In 1937, Miss Mary Harper, second daughter of Mr. and Mrs. Albert Harper from The Werps, married John Horton of Birmingham.

== Land and roads at The Werps ==
In 1829, John Wilde, of The Werps, bought Werps Meadow, in an auction of part of the Tuckies Estate. The probate of John Wilde's will was dated 1861 and his estate was sold off in 1893. Wilde's association with the licensing trade at The Werps is evident by an 1895 entry in the National Archives which reads "Copy conveyance — trustee of John Wild's will to the City Brewery Co. (Lichfield) Ltd. Piece of garden at the Werps, Broseley. 1681/104/40 19 Dec 1895"

In 1895, land and property at The Werps was auctioned off. Lot 5 being a dwelling-house and small cottage adjoining, with brew-house, outbuildings, and large garden. It also included seven nearby dwelling-houses, outbuildings and large garden, selling for a total of £200 to Mr. J. D. Smith from the King's Head, Broseley who is later mentioned as being landlord of the nearby Duke of Wellington at Tuckies. In the same 1895 auction, Lot 6, a piece of land called "Werps Meadow" which adjoined property in Lot 5, together with tow-path rights and land alongside the River Severn, were also purchased by Mr. J. D. Smith, for £100. A piece of garden ground adjoining the road leading from the Tuckies to the Werps, auctioned as Lot 7, was sold to Mr. Durnall, of Madeley, for £16.

In 1895, an extract from Wellington Journal & Shrewsbury News, 1895 outlines that Councillor Exley successfully called for repairs to the bad state of the road near the Werps.

== Disease ==
In 1832, a cholera outbreak was so serious, it was called "the plague", and the large house at the Calcutts was set apart as a hospital. It swept away hundreds, if not thousands, in the Broseley neighbourhood. Great numbers died along the river side, and on board barges on the river, especially between May and September of that year. The Bishop consecrated a piece of ground at Jackfield church on for the burial of those who were victims of the plague, often contracting the disease, dying and being buried on the same day; even sometimes being buried before they were dead, according to the Broseley Journal.

9 April 1904 – The District Council's sanitary Inspector reported two cases of scarlet fever. One at the Werps, and one at Lloyds Head.
