= Cement tile =

French tile manufacturing process from Árabic origins

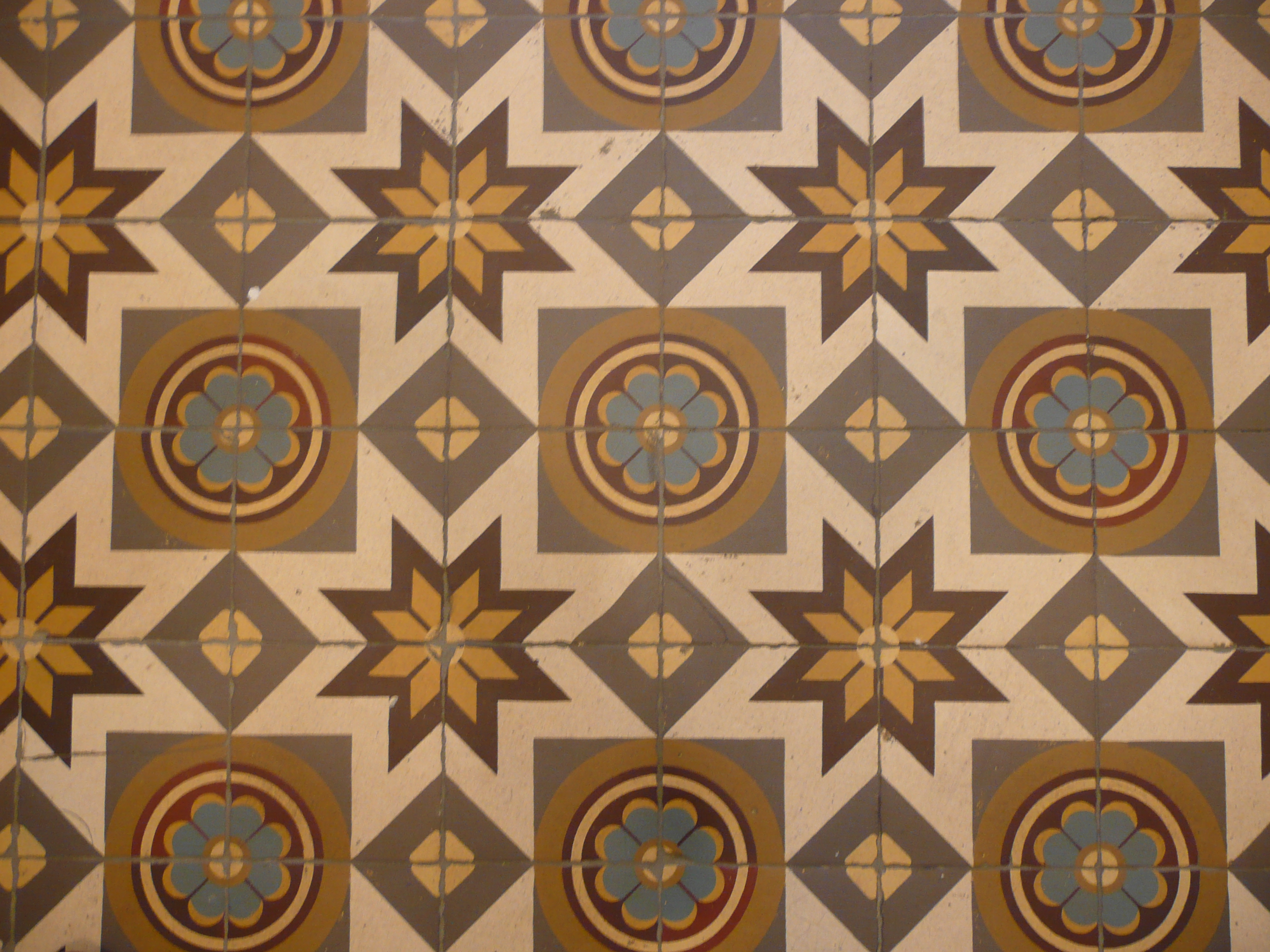
Cement tiles, end of 19th century

Cement tiles or hydraulic tiles are handmade colourful tiles used as floor and wall tiling. They appeared in Catalonia (Spain) in the 1850s, and have been widely used in Europe and America. Another origin is from Viviers, in the south of France, location of the cement factory Lafarge. They represented a revolution in flooring in their day because they were much cheaper, more durable and easier to make than the previous handmade glazed ceramic tiles and were therefore more universally available for houses, and they allowed for profuse decorative patterns, their age of splendour being the end of the 19th to the middle of the 20th century, before they were gradually superseded by newer technologies as of the 1960s, such as terrazzo, salt-glazed stoneware, that did not allow for such decorative embellishment but were cheaper.

Cement tiles are not fired; there is no glaze layer on the surface of the tile. They derive their durability from the combination of finely dehydrated ground Portland cement layer and a coarser layer of sand and cement. The pigment layer is hydraulically pressed into the surface and becomes a part of the tile.

== History ==
Cement tiles appeared in the 1850s in Catalonia, Spain. They were exhibited in the Paris (France) International Exposition of 1867 by the Catalan company Garret & Rivet.

In the United States, several sources say the first tiles were made near the country's first Portland cement plant. Around the turn of the 20th century, the tiles were very popular and were considered a high-end floor covering. It was used in thousands of landmark public buildings and palaces. Their popularity began to wane in the 1920s but spread again in the 1940s primarily in California and Florida.

== Manufacture and quality ==
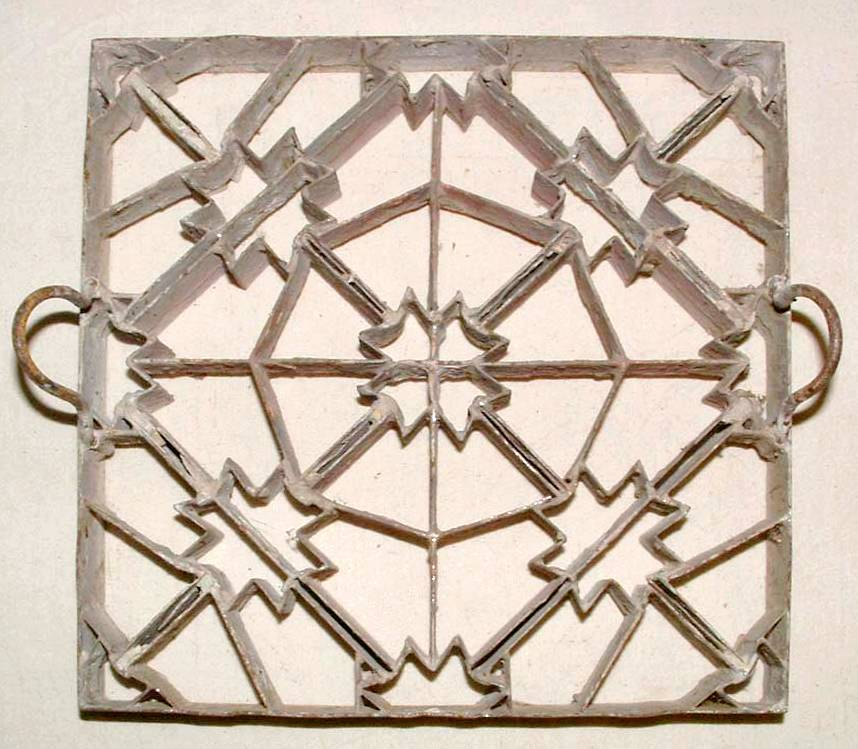
Cement tile mold, France, 1920

Cement tiles are made by hand, one at a time, using mineral pigments, cement, a mold, and a hydraulic press. The metal mold is handmade following specific design drawings. The pigment composition is a mixture of high-quality white Portland cement, marble powder, fine sand, and natural mineral colour pigments. Cement tiles, being handmade, are expected to have slight imperfections, which give them character and depth.

There are numerous cement tile manufacturers worldwide. The primary difference between manufacturers is the hydraulic method used. Small companies employ a hand-operated hydraulic press; the quality of the tiles varies due to inconsistent pressure. Larger manufacturers use electric-powered hydraulic presses that produce a consistently higher quality product. The higher pressure of 10,000 kPa (1,500 psi) permits a thicker pigment layer to be embedded into the cement layer. The pigment layer is usually 3–4 mm (0.12–0.16 in) thick.

Another difference is the quality of the pigments used. High-quality producers use mineral-based pigments only. Non-mineral-based pigments fade with age.

The quality of cement tiles varies from manufacturer to manufacturer based on 3 major factors:

1. The sharpness of pattern and color: depending on the artisan's skill and the components of the color layer, the patterns in cement tile will be clearer, the details sharper, and there will be less variation in surface color.
2. The thickness of the color layer. Cement tiles have two parts: the color layer – made with white cement, and the body layer – made with grey cement. Under the effect of weather, temperature, and traffic, the layers shrink or expand differently, thus creating hair cracks on the surface. Tiles with a thicker color layer – at least 2.5–3 mm (0.098–0.118 in) – suffer less from this effect.
3. The surface hardness of the color layer depends on the quality of the white cement, on water absorption, and on the strength of the tile surface. If the tile has a harder surface, it will become shinier with time. In contrast, a soft tile's surface gets duller with traffic.

== See also ==
- Encaustic tile
- Panot
