= Jackfield Tile Museum =

Museum of ceramic tile making, part of the Ironbridge Gorge

Coordinates: 52.6233°N 2.4639°W

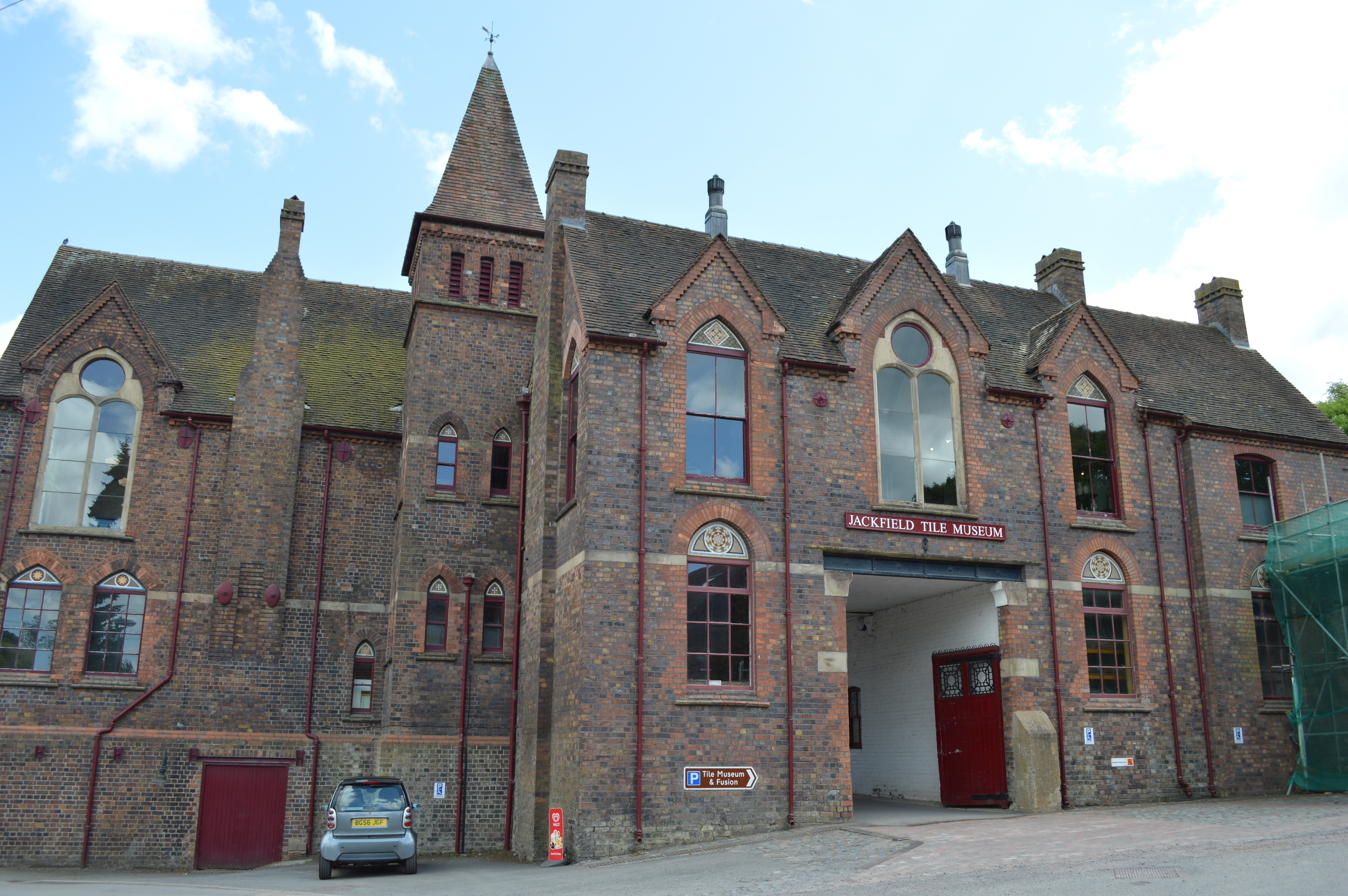
Jackfield Tile Museum

Jackfield Tile Museum is a museum which presents the history of the British decorative tile industry between 1840 and 1960, the period in which this factory and that of Maw & Co nearby played an important part in this industry. The museum lies in the village of Jackfield, near Broseley, on the south bank of the River Severn in the Ironbridge Gorge, in Shropshire, England. It is located within a World Heritage Site, the birthplace of the Industrial Revolution. It is managed by the National Trust and is one of the ten museums to be acquired from the Ironbridge Gorge Museum Trust in 2026.

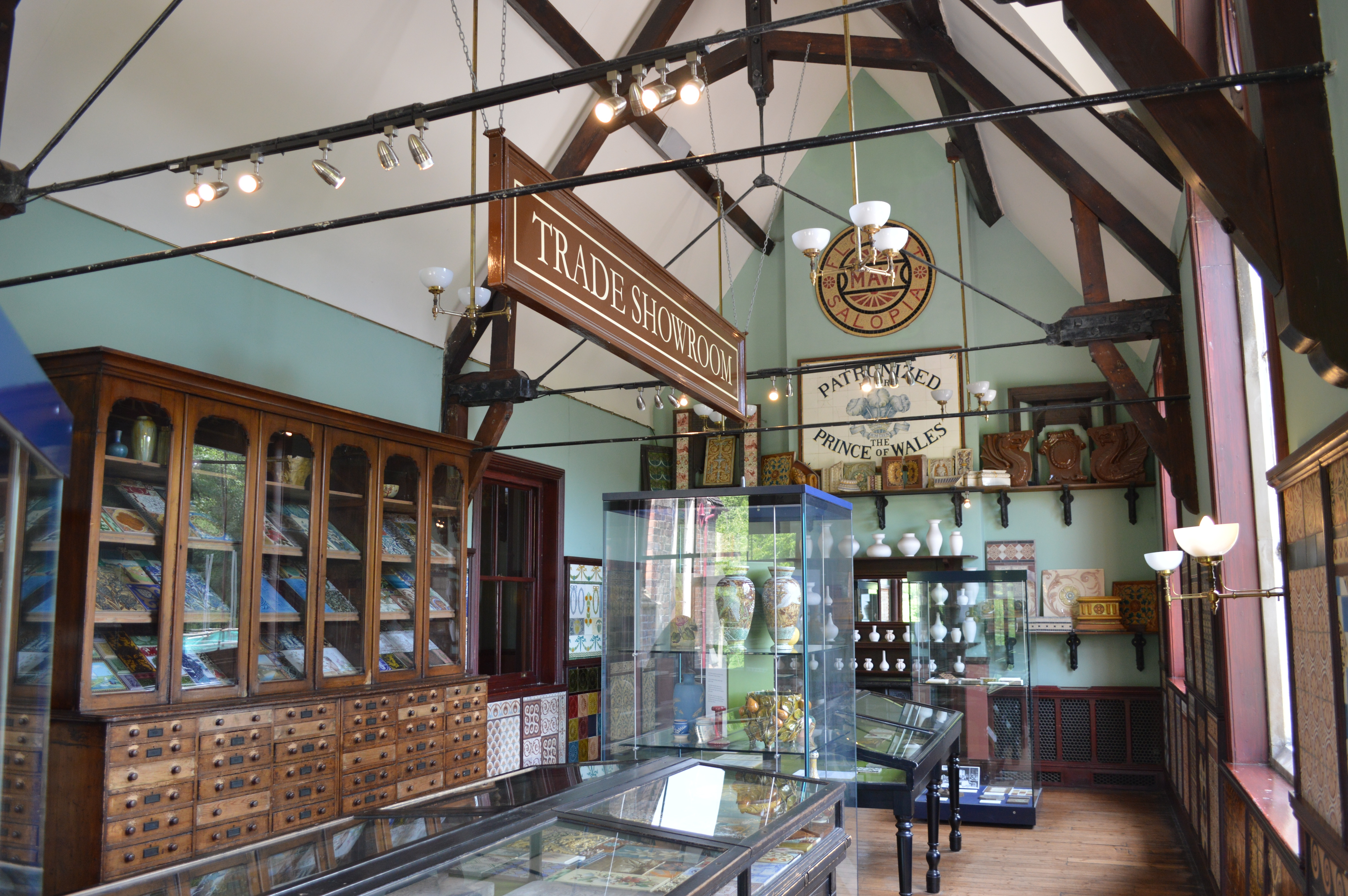
Inside the original showroom of the factory

The museum is housed in a decorative tile factory building, the former works of Craven Dunnill and Company, that is still used to produce tiles, particularly encaustic tiles.

Jackfield is one of the oldest known ceramic production centres in Shropshire, a tradition dating back to the 16th century. The Thursfield family from Stoke-on-Trent settled in Jackfield in 1713; Jackfield wares are attributed to the family.

Craven Dunnill gave up its Jackfield works in the early 1950s, moving to Bridgnorth, and the buildings were used by a firm making iron and bronze castings. In 1983, the Ironbridge Gorge Museum Trust purchased the works with the aid of an Architectural Heritage Fund grant. In 1989, tile manufacture restarted on the site and in 2001 Craven Dunnill took over this business again. In 1992 the frontage office and some of the workshop buildings: the Blunging House, Clay Arks, Tile Press Shop, and the Kiln House, were Grade II* and II listed.

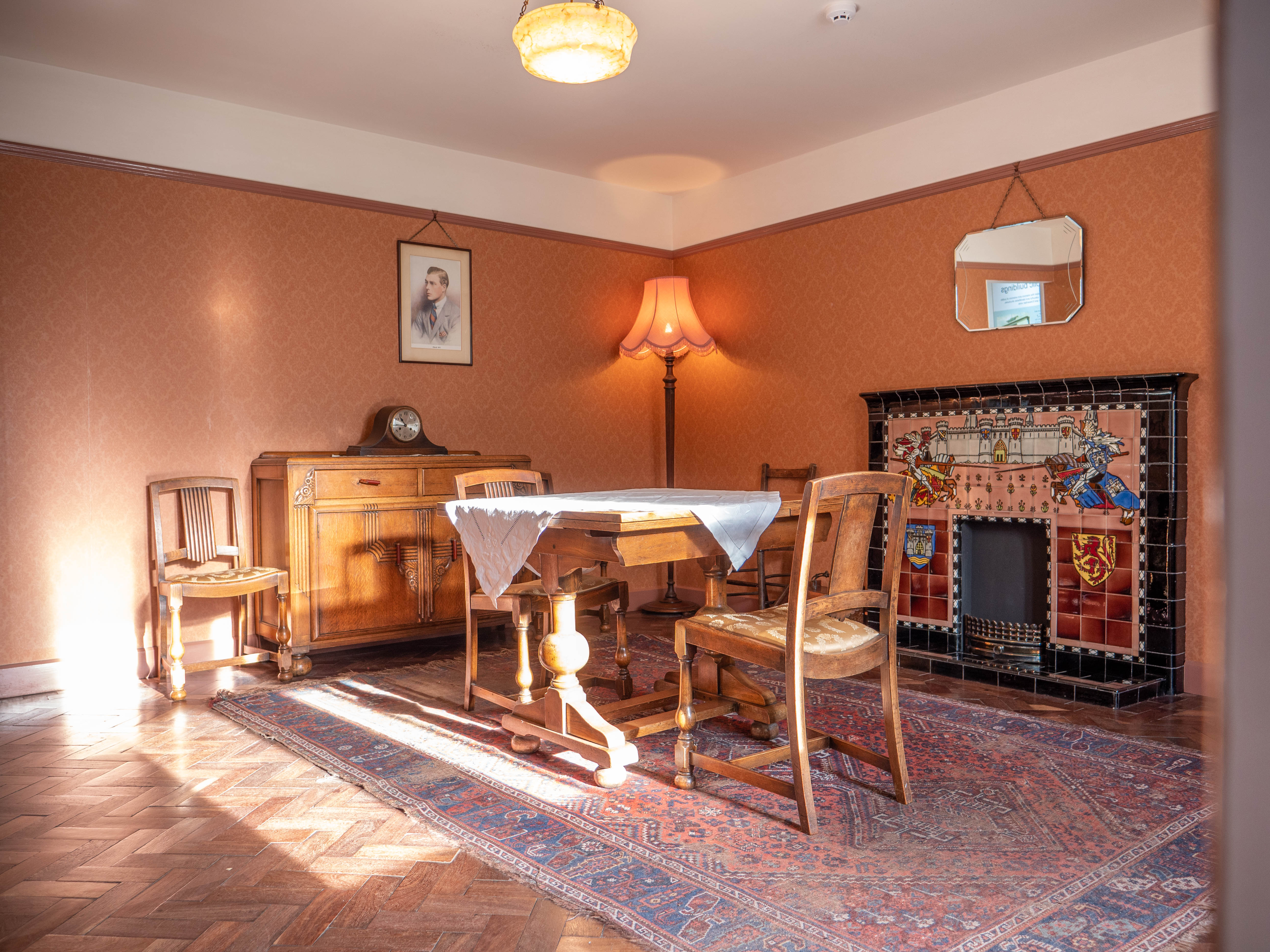
The 1930s living room tiled period setting at the museum

The collections include work by William De Morgan and other historic tilers. It also includes tiles from a children’s ward previously at Middlesex Hospital and the old Charing Cross Hospital.

In 2014 the museum was gifted a 1,300 piece collection of tiles from the 19th and 20th century by John Scott.

== See also ==
- Listed buildings in Broseley
