= Encaustic tile =

Ceramic tile of different colours of clay

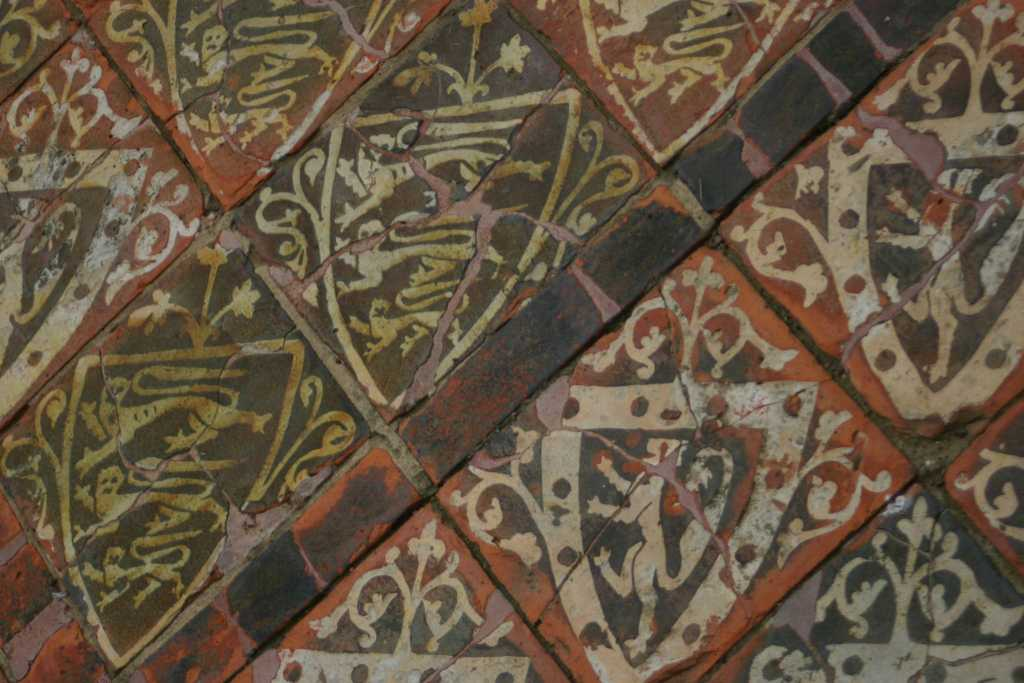
Medieval encaustic tiles at Cleeve Abbey, England

Encaustic or inlaid tiles are ceramic tiles in which the pattern or figure on the surface is not a product of the glaze but of different colors of clay. They are usually of two colours but a tile may be composed of as many as six. The pattern appears inlaid into the body of the tile, so that the design remains as the tile is worn down. Encaustic tiles may be glazed or unglazed and the inlay may be as shallow as 1/8 inch (3 mm), as is often the case with "printed" encaustic tile from the later medieval period, or as deep as 1/4 in (6.4 mm).

== History ==
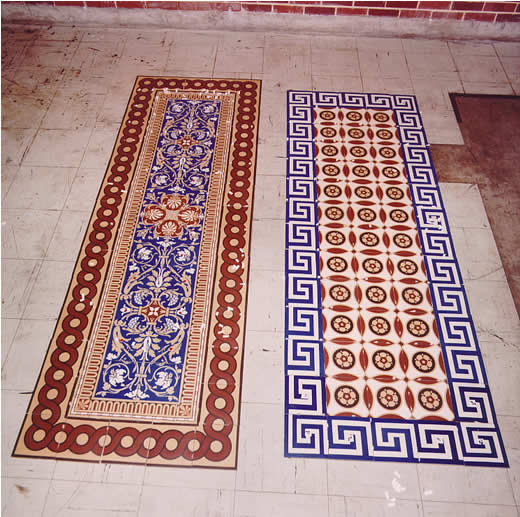
Minton encaustic tiles awaiting installation at the United States Capitol.

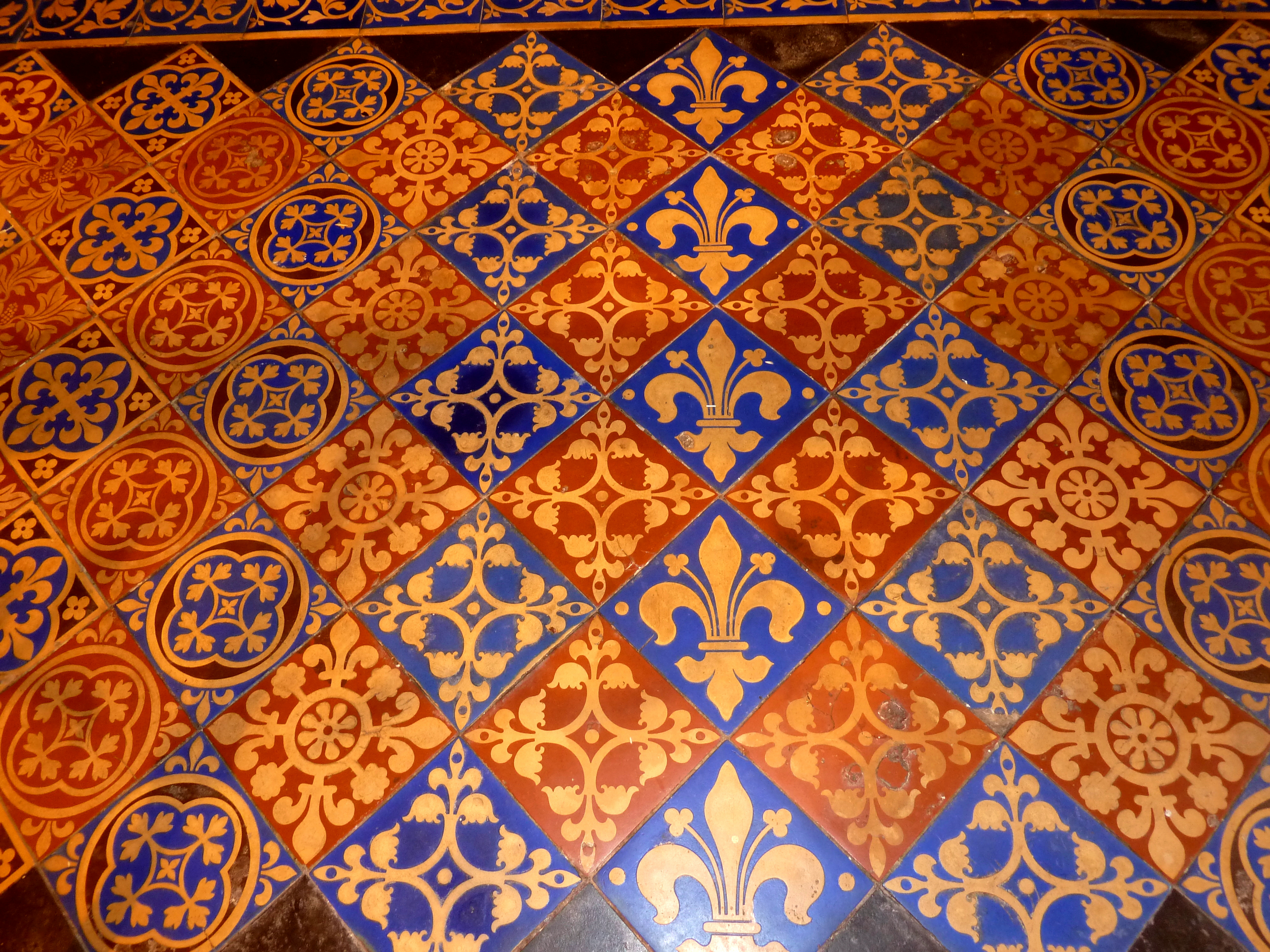
Victorian English Gothic Revival tiles

The tiles known as encaustic tiles in the Victorian period were, in the medieval period, known as inlaid tiles. The use of the word encaustic to describe an inlaid tile of two or more colors is linguistically incorrect. The word encaustic, from the Ancient Greek: ἐγκαυστικός, means 'burning in', from ἐν, en, 'in', and καίειν, kaiein, 'to burn'.

The term encaustic originally described a process of painting with a beeswax-based paint that was then fixed with heat. It was also applied to a process of medieval enameling. The term did not come into use when describing tile until the 19th century; supposedly, Victorians thought that the two colour tiles strongly resembled enamel work and so called them encaustic. Despite the error, the term has now been in common use for so long that it is an accepted name for inlaid tile work.

Encaustic or inlaid tiles enjoyed two periods of great popularity. The first came in the 13th century and lasted until the English Reformation under Henry VIII of England in the 16th century, which eschewed and removed much medieval church decoration along with the policy of the dissolution of the monasteries.

The second period of popularity came when the tiles caught the attention of craftsmen during the Gothic Revival era, who, after much trial and error, mass-produced encaustic tiles, and made them available to the general public. During both periods, tiles were made across Western Europe, though the centre of tile production was in England. Companies in the United States also made encaustic tile during the Gothic Revival architecture style's period. The American Encaustic Tiling Company of Zanesville, Ohio, was active until 1935. However, in the 1930s, encaustic tiling began to lose ground to more affordable glass and vitreous glass tiles.

== Manufacture ==
Modern encaustic tiles use a two-shot moulding process. The 'inlay' colour is moulded first. For multiple colours, a mould with cavities for each colour is used and the individual colours are filled carefully. This coloured clay is then placed face-down in a mould that is backfilled with the body colour. The tiles are then fired.

The manufacture of encaustic clay tiles may be seen today at the Jackfield Tile Museum, one of the Ironbridge Gorge museums.

== Use ==
In both the Middle Ages and in the 19th and 20th centuries Gothic Revival, tiles were most often made for and laid in churches. Even tiles that were laid in private homes were often copies of those found in religious settings. Encaustic tile floors exist all over Europe and North America, but are most prevalent in England where the greatest number of inlaid tiles were made.

== See also ==
- Encaustic painting, or hot wax painting
- American Encaustic Tiling Company
- Cement tile
- Jackfield Tile Museum – Museum of ceramic tile making, part of the Ironbridge Gorge
- Panot

== General and cited references ==
- Haberly, Loyd (1037). Mediaeval English Pavingtiles.
