= Cotman (surname) =

Cotman is the surname of the following people:

- Aljaž Cotman (born 1994), Slovenian football goalkeeper
- Carl Cotman, American neurologist and neuroscientist
- A British family of artists
  - John Sell Cotman (1782–1842), English marine and landscape painter, etcher, illustrator and author
  - Miles Edmund Cotman (1810–1858), English artist, son of John Sell
  - John Joseph Cotman (1814–1878), English landscape painter, son of John Sell
  - Thomas Cotman (1847–1925), English architect and painter, nephew of John Sell
  - Frederick George Cotman (1850–1920), English landscape and portrait artist, nephew of John Sell and brother of Thomas Cotman
