= Frederick George Cotman =

- Born: 14 August 1850; Ipswich, Suffolk
- Died: 16 July 1920 (aged 69); Felixstowe, Suffolk
- Occupation: Artist
- Notable work: One of the Family
- Movement: Norwich School of painters
- Spouse: Anne Barclay Grahame

Frederick George Cotman (Ipswich 14 August 1850 – 16 July 1920) was a British painter of landscapes, portraits and interiors and a member of the Norwich School of painters.

== Life ==
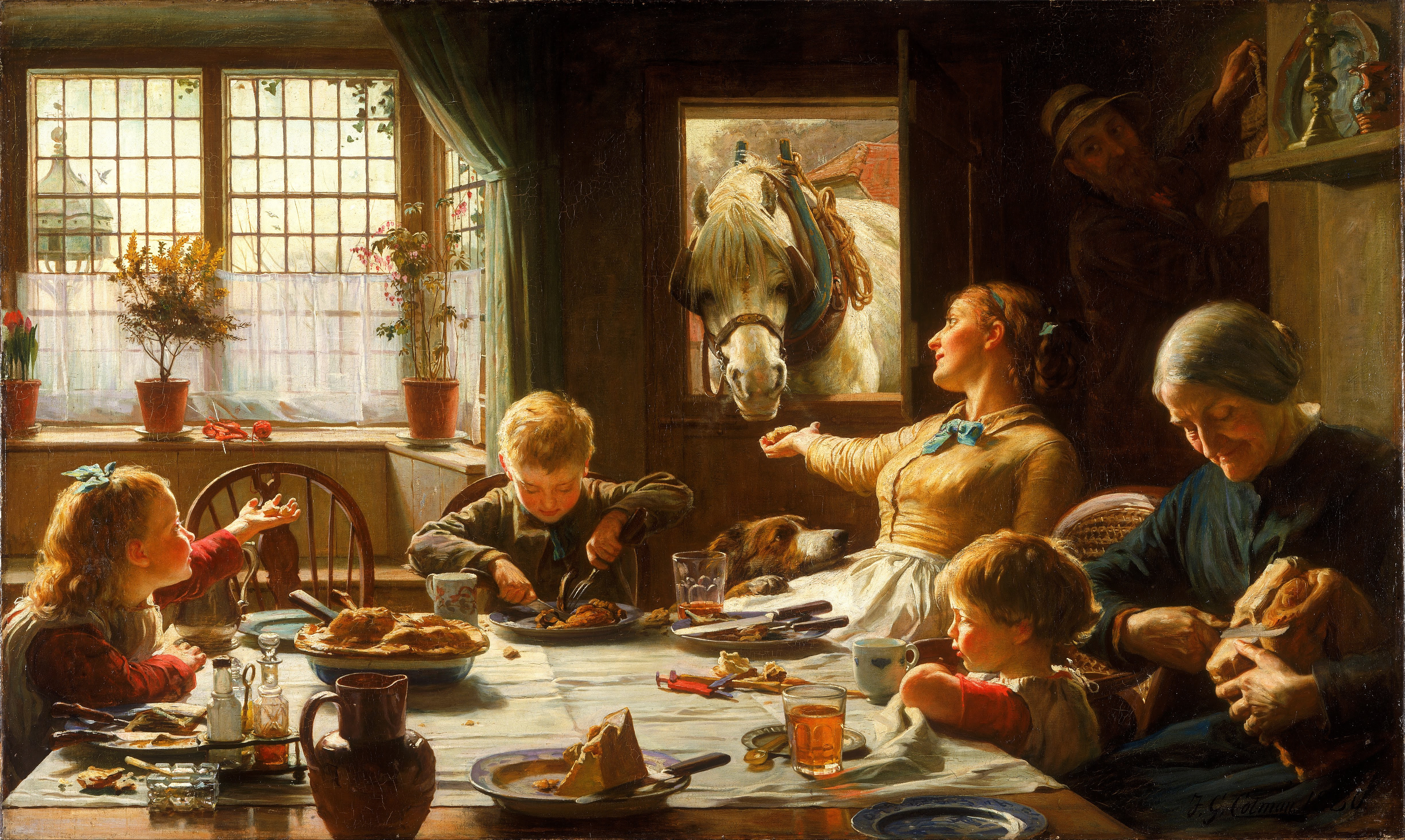
One of the Family (1880; Walker Art Gallery)

Frederick was born into the Cotman family of artists. His parents were Henry Edmund Cotman (1802–1871), formerly a Norwich silk merchant and his wife Maria Taylor (1813–1895). His elder brothers, Henry Edmund Cotman (1844–1914), and Thomas Cotman (1847–1925) were born in London before the family moved to Ipswich. Frederick was born at 186 Wykes Bishop Street, Ipswich in 1850 and was the youngest child of the family He was the nephew of John Sell Cotman and the cousin of John Joseph Cotman and Miles Edmund Cotman. He was a private pupil of William Thomson Griffiths, the Head of Ipswich School of Art.

Cotman links with the Norwich School of painters arise mainly because of his family connection with John Sell Cotman, who was one of its leading artists. However he never lived in Norfolk, unlike so many of the artists of the school.

He worked in both oil and watercolours. His best known work, One of the Family, is now held by the Walker Art Gallery in Liverpool. Throughout his career, which was generally spent in London, he created over thirty paintings. He was a founder member of the influential Ipswich Art Club, and remained a member of it all his life.

Cotman died in Felixstowe on 16 July 1920.

== Bibliography ==
- Walpole, Josephine (1997). Art and Artists of the Norwich School. Woodbridge: Antique Collectors' Club. ISBN 1-85149-261-5.
