= John Cotman =

John Cotman may refer to:

- John Sell Cotman (1782–1842), English marine and landscape painter
- John Joseph Cotman (1814–1878), his son, English landscape painter
