= List of works by John Sell Cotman =

This is an incomplete list of paintings by the British artist John Sell Cotman.

== Attributed works ==
Image	Title	Date	Technique	height x width (cm)	Location	Commentary

== Works ==
Image	Title	Date	Technique	height x width (cm)	Location	Commentary
	Abbatial House of the Abbey of St Ouen at Rouen	1825	Watercolour on paper	57.3 x 42.3	Norfolk Museums Collections	Described by Dickes, exhibited in 1825.
	Greta Bridge	c. 1805	Watercolour over graphite sketch	32.9 x 22.7	British Museum	see the link to the British Museum website for full details of this painting
	title	date	description	size	location	comments
