= Cotman =

Cotman may refer to

- Cotman (surname)
- Cotman's Ash, a hamlet in Kent, England
- Cotman v Brougham, a 1918 UK company law case
