= Paul Sandby Munn =

English watercolour painter (1773–1845)

Paul Sandby Munn, RWS (1773 – 1845) was an English water-colour painter.

== Life ==
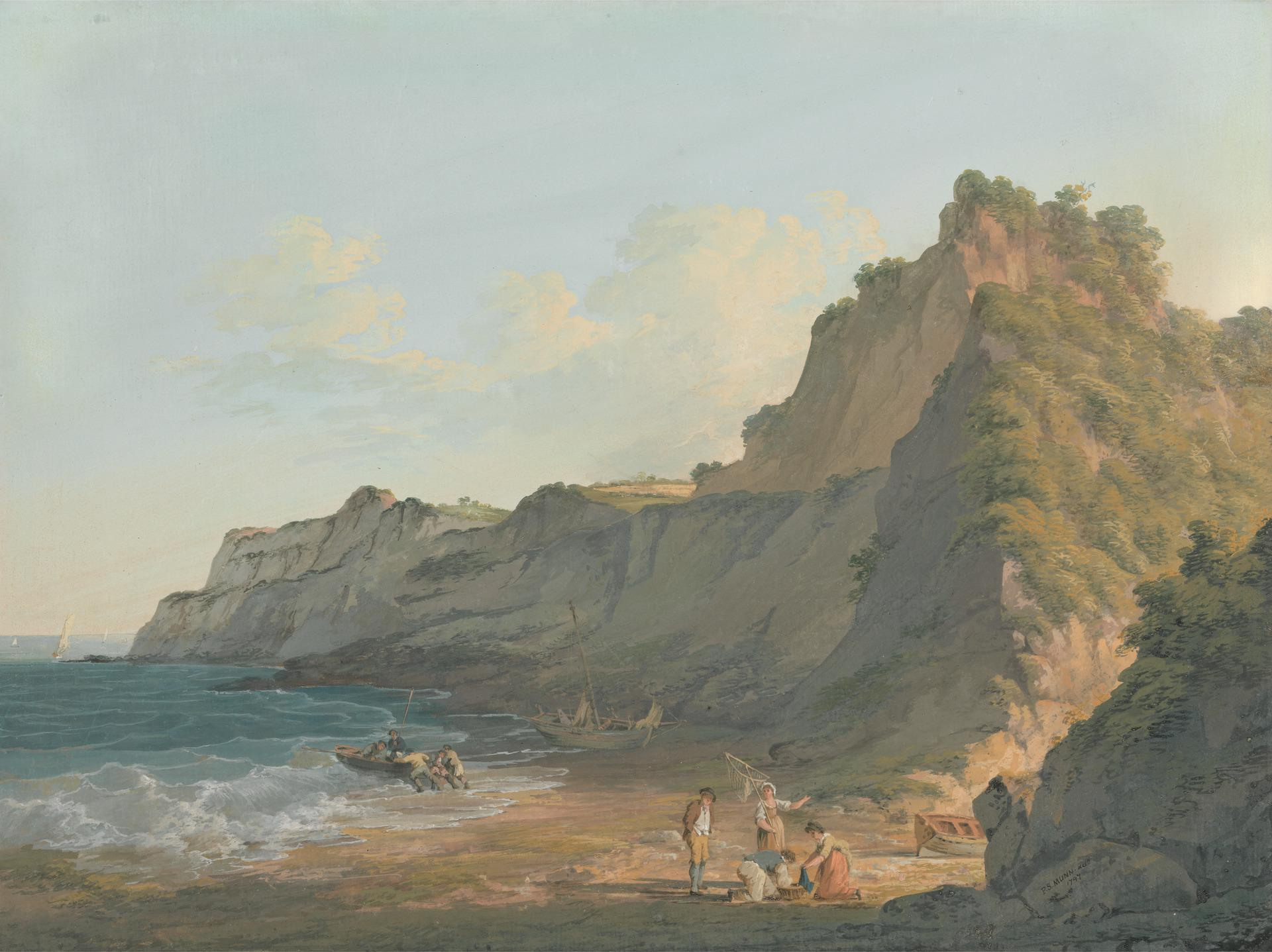
Shanklin Chine, Isle of Wight (1797)

Paul Sanby Munn, born at Thornton Row, Greenwich, on 8 February 1773, was son of James Munn, carriage decorator and landscape-painter, and Charlotte Mills, his wife. His father was an occasional exhibitor at the Old Society of Painters in Water-colours and at the Society of Artists from 1764 to 1774. Munn was named after his godfather, Paul Sandby, who gave him his first instructions in water-colour painting. He first exhibited at the Royal Academy in 1798, sending some views in the Isle of Wight, and was subsequently a frequent contributor of topographical drawings to that and other exhibitions. He was elected an associate exhibitor of the Old Society of Painters in Water-colours in 1806, and was for some years a contributor to their exhibitions. He was an intimate friend of John Sell Cotman, and they made several sketching tours together at home and abroad. He drew some of the views in Britton's Beauties of England and Wales.

Munn's drawings are delicately and carefully executed, usually in pale and thin colours, resembling the tinted drawings of the early school of water-colour painting. In 1894 there were examples in the South Kensington Museum and the print room, British Museum. Munn painted little after 1832, when he devoted himself chiefly to music. He married Cecilia, daughter of Captain Timothy Essex, but died without issue at Margate on 17 February 1845.

== Bibliography ==
- Cust, Lionel Henry (1894). "Munn, Paul Sandby" . In Lee, Sidney (ed.). Dictionary of National Biography. Vol. 39. London: Smith, Elder & Co. pp. 304–305.
- Oliver, Valerie Cassel, ed. (2011). "Munn, Paul Sandby". In Benezit Dictionary of Artists. Oxford University Press.
- Sloman, Susan (2004). "Munn, Paul Sandby (1773–1845), watercolour painter". In Oxford Dictionary of National Biography. Oxford University Press.
