= Thomas Cotman =

English architect and painter

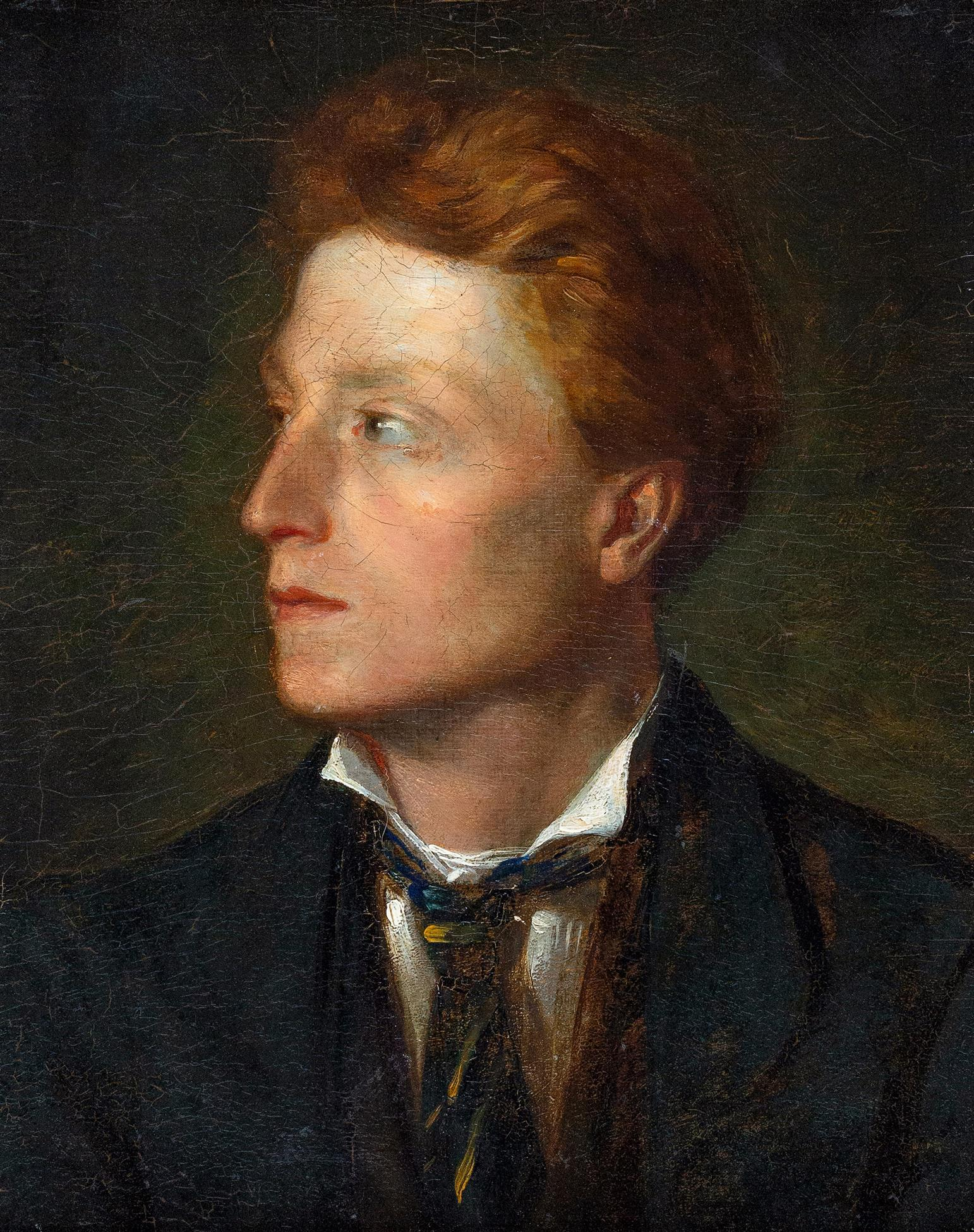
- Thomas William Cotman - by his brother Frederick George Cotman, (oil on canvas board, circa 1870)
- Born: 1847; Bermondsey
- Died: 30 October 1925 (aged 77–78); Felixstowe
- Occupation: Painter, architect

Thomas William Cotman (1847, Bermondsey – 30 October 1925 Felixstowe) was an English architect and painter active in Felixstowe.

== Family ==
Thomas was born into the Cotman family of artists. His parents were Henry Edmund Cotman (1802–1871), formerly a Norwich silk merchant and his wife Maria Taylor (1813–1895). His elder brother was Henry Edmund Cotman (1844–1914) also born in London, but his younger brother, Frederick George Cotman was born in Ipswich whither the family had moved.

== Architectural work ==
Cotman was influenced by the Arts and Crafts Movement and was responsible for a number of Arts and Crafts style buildings in Felixstowe.

=== Gallery ===
==== Grade II listed Buildings ====
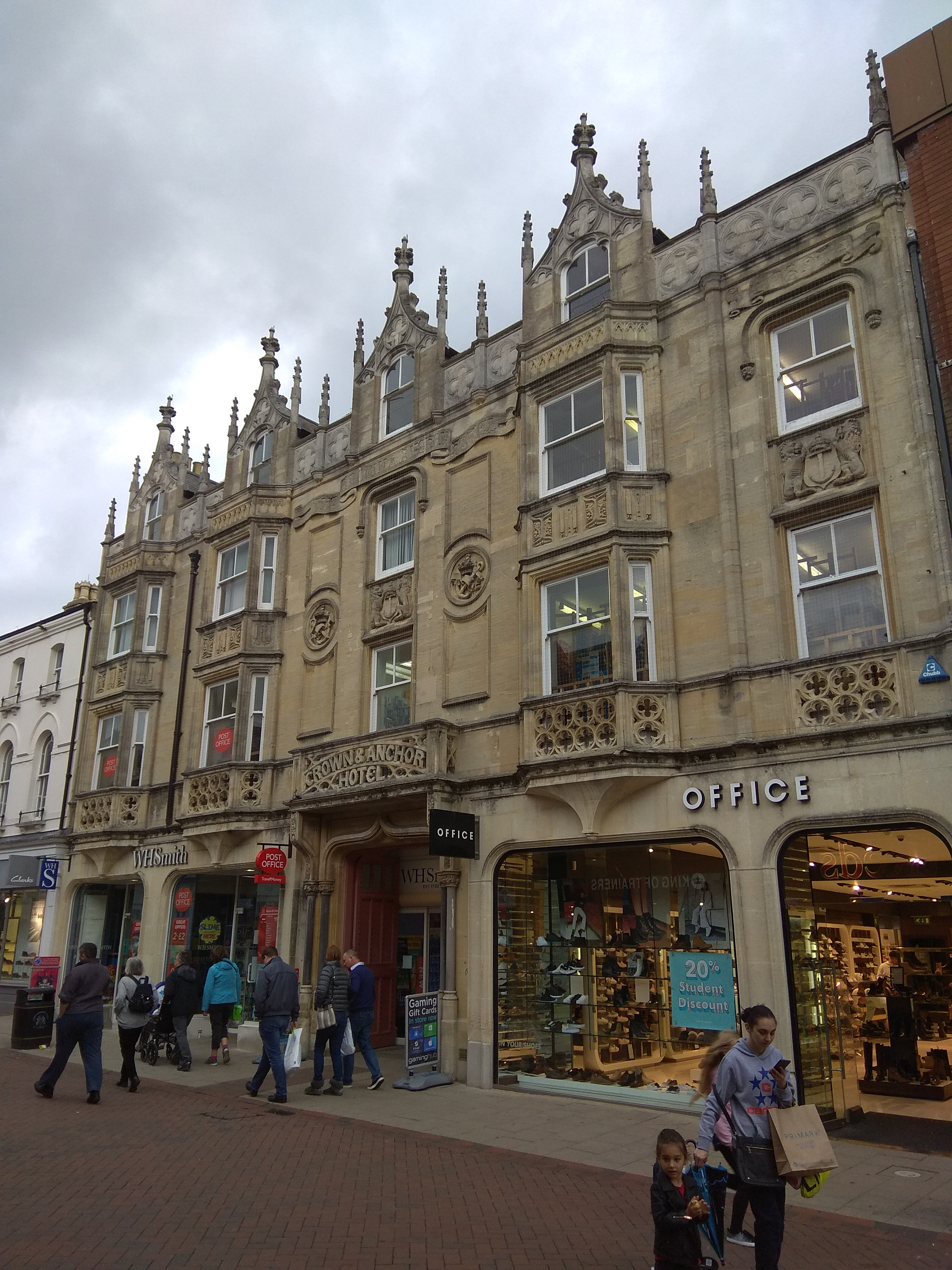
Crown and Anchor, westgate Street, Ipswich

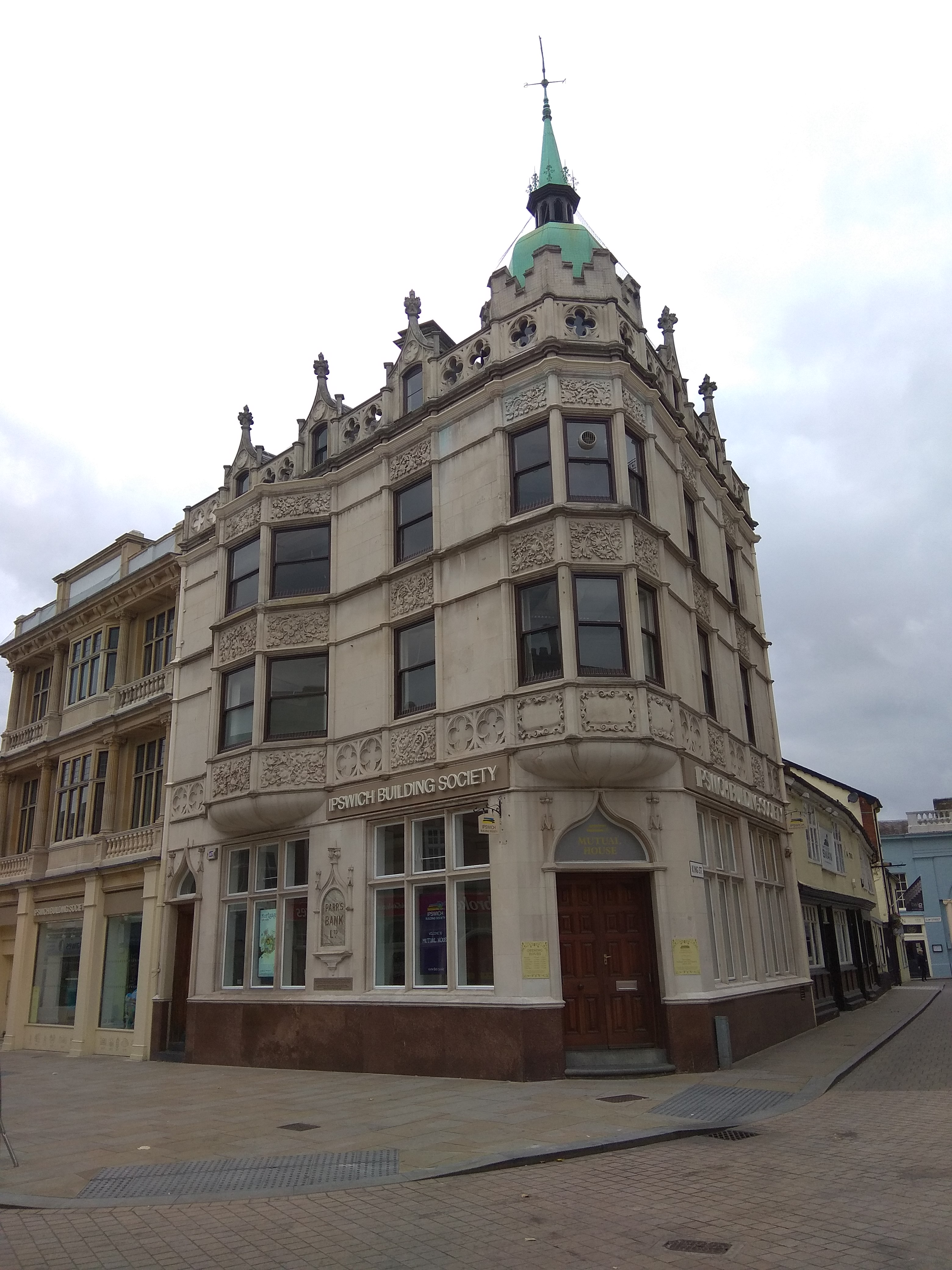
Parr's Bank, Ipswich

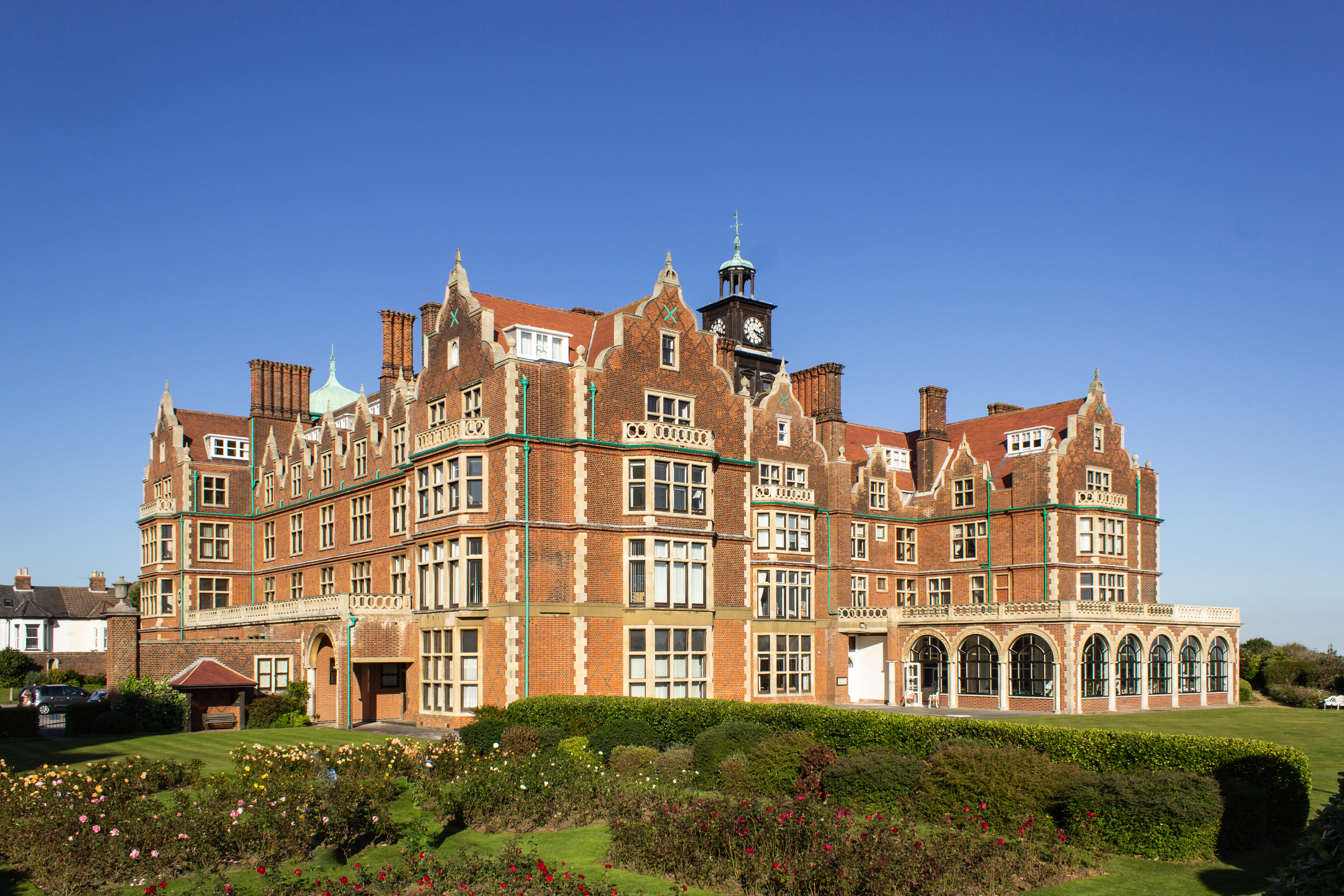
Harvest House, Felixstowe
