= Miles Edmund Cotman =

English painter

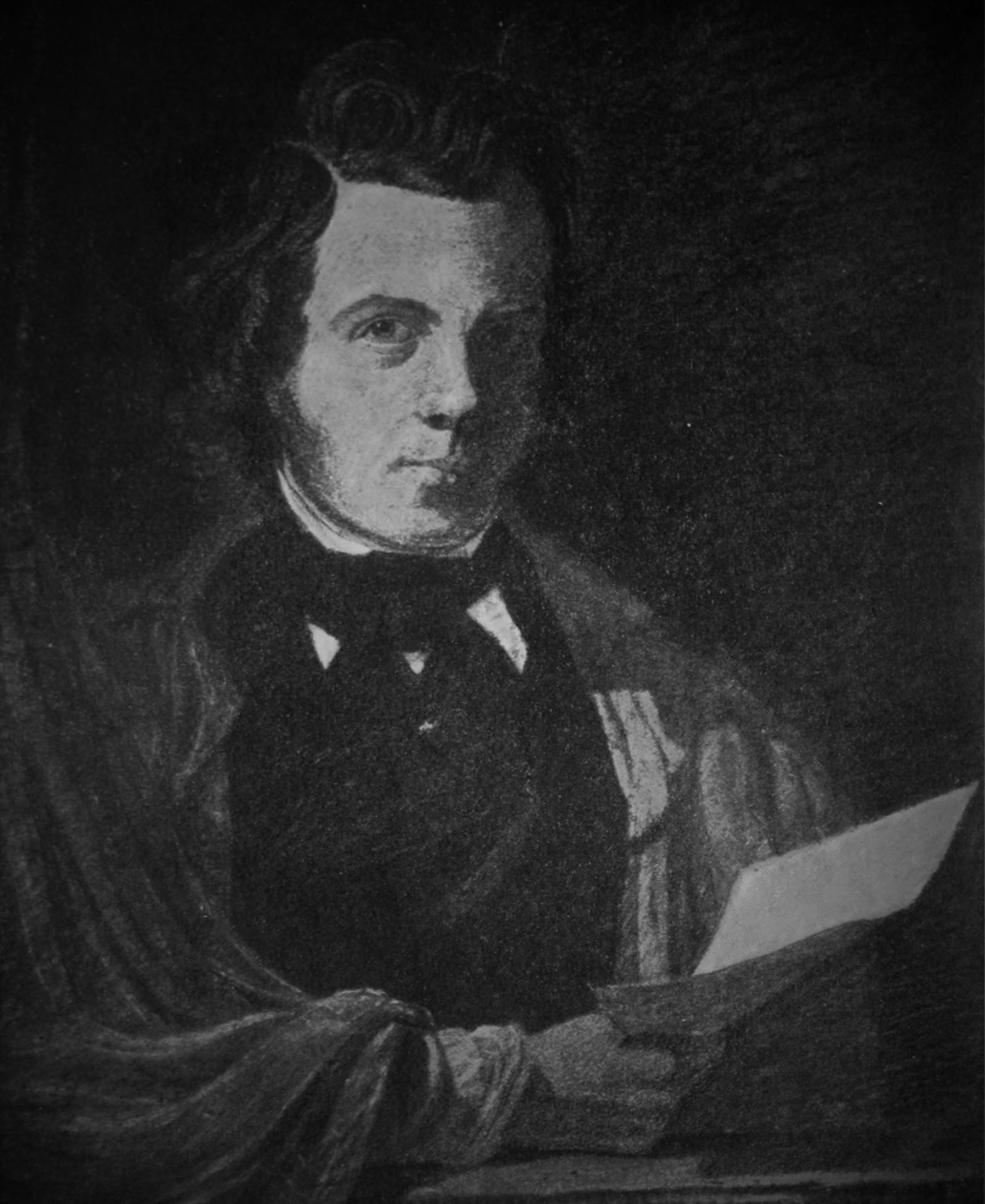
- Born: 5 February 1810
- Died: 23 January 1858 (aged 47); Norwich
- Education: John Sell Cotman
- Known for: Landscape painting
- Movement: Norwich School of painters

Miles Edmund Cotman (5 February 1810 – 23 January 1858) was an English artist of the Norwich School of painters, the eldest son of John Sell Cotman.

== Life ==
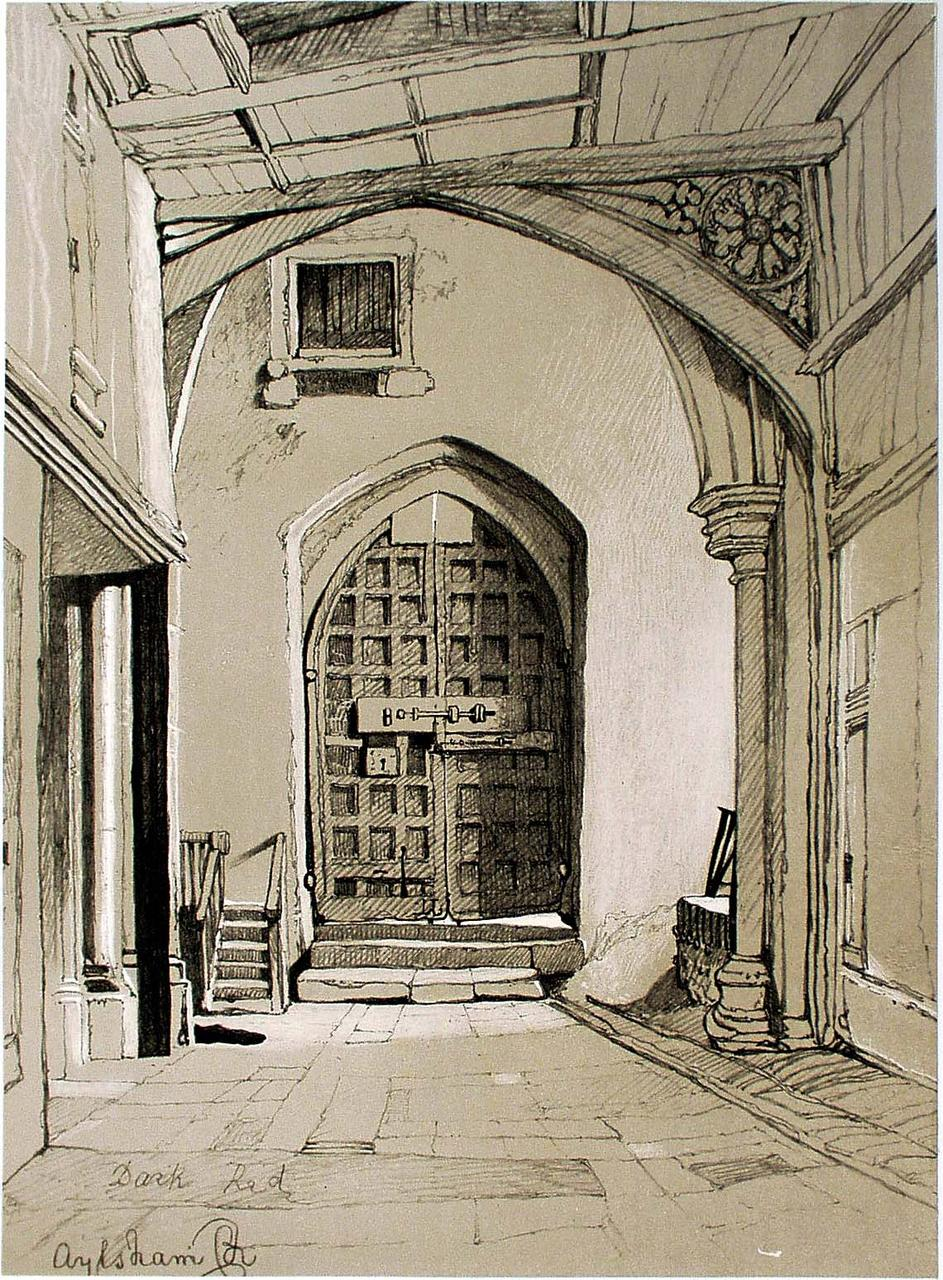
Aylsham Church (undated lithograph), Norfolk Museums Collections

Cotman was born on 5 February 1810, the son of the artist John Sell Cotman and Ann Miles. Taught to paint by his father, he first exhibited with the Norwich Society at the age of thirteen, and by the time of the society's closure in 1833 had shown sixty works. Some of his early watercolours were continental scenes, probably based on prints, or on sketches by his father's friend, W.H. Herriott.

When his father left to take up a post teaching at King's College School in London, Cotman took over his practice as a drawing-master in Norwich. Once the family home in St Martin's Plain in Norwich had been sold, however, he moved to London to assist his father, while his younger brother, John Joseph, who had accompanied his father to the capital, returned to take over the family's teaching practice. At first Cotman had no official post at the school, but in December 1836 he was appointed Assistant Drawing Master. Sometimes father and son collaborated on paintings. One joint work depicts the wreck of the ship carrying the works of art sold by Robert Walpole to Catherine the Great – a completely imaginary incident. He stood in for his father during illnesses and absences, and succeeded to his post following his death in 1842.

His watercolours followed the style of his father's more brightly coloured works of the late 1820s and early 1830s. John Sell Cotman thought his son had a "hard dry manner", although his style gradually loosened, He was especially fond of painting shipping scenes, sometimes based on sketches made aboard a small boat owned by the Cotman family on trips along the coast to the Thames estuary and the River Medway.

Two sets of etchings by Cotman were published by Charles Muskett.

From the mid-1830s he exhibited frequently in both London and Norwich, many of the works being in oil. For most of his time in London he lived at 42 Hunter Street, near Brunswick Square. In 1851, however, he was living in Haverstock Hill, and soon afterwards left London due to poor health. He moved in with his brother John Joseph at Thorpe, near Norwich. They later moved to Great Plumstead. He died in the Norfolk and Norwich Hospital on 23 January 1858.

== Sources ==
- Bell, C. F. Miles Edmund Cotman (1810-1858) With a Catalogue of Fifty Drawings by him selected from the Bulwer Collection. London: Walker's Galleries.
- Moore, Andrew (1985). The Norwich School of Artists. London: HMSO.
