= John Joseph Cotman =

British artist (1814–1878)

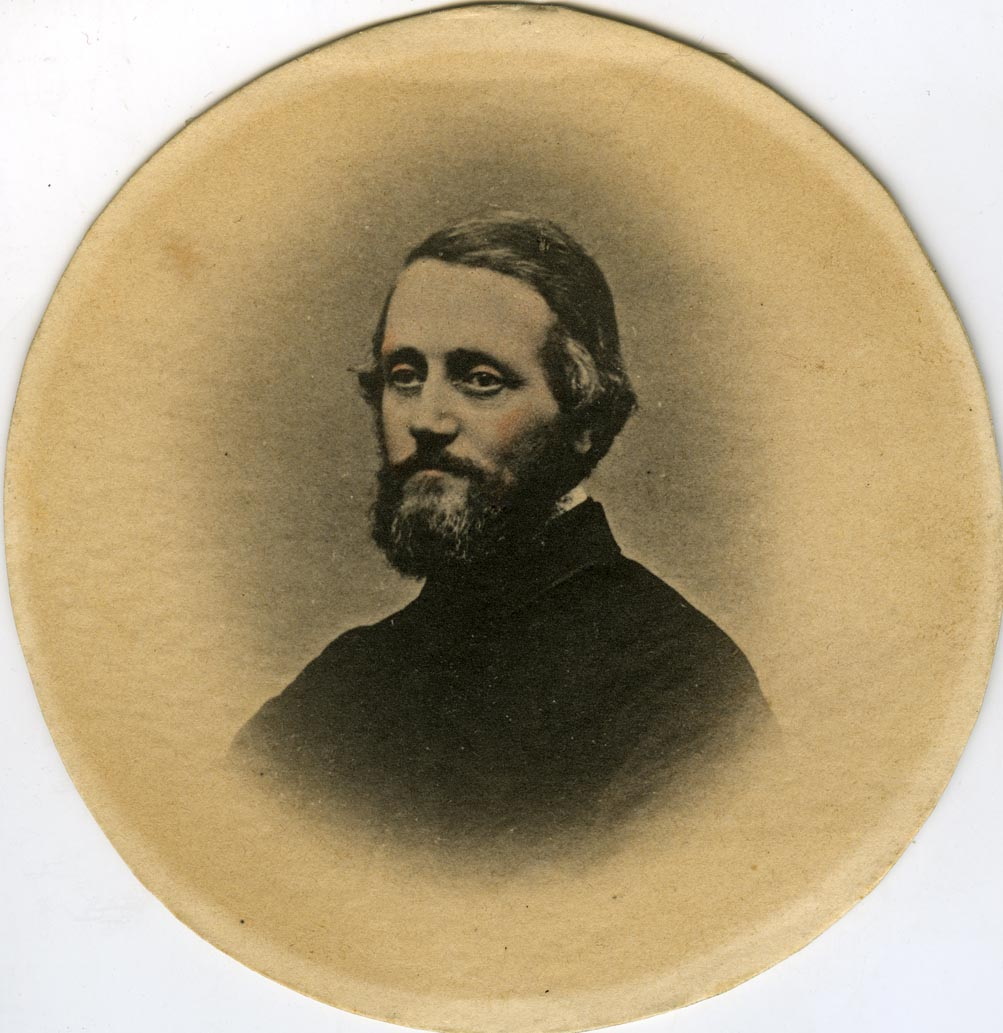
- Born: 1814; Great Yarmouth
- Died: 1878 (aged 63–64); Norwich
- Known for: Landscape painting
- Movement: Norwich School of painters

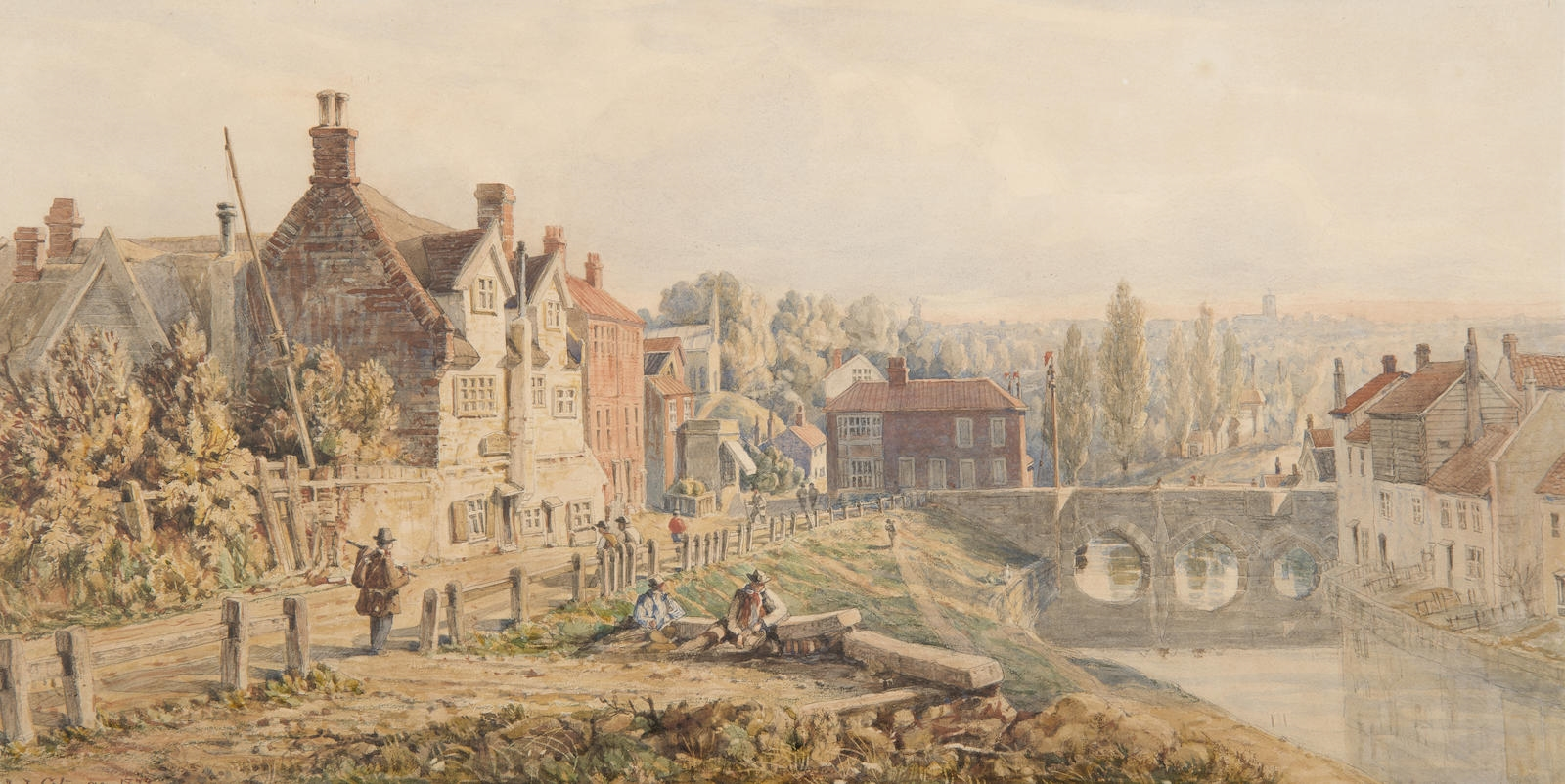
Bishop's Bridge, Norwich, 1872

John Joseph Cotman (1814–1878) was an English landscape painter, the second son of John Sell Cotman.

== Life ==
Cotman was born in 1814 at Southtown, Great Yarmouth, and was baptised on 6 June 1814.

He was sent to work for his uncle, a haberdasher, but spent much of his time making sketches in the countryside. When his father was appointed drawing-master at King's College School in London in 1834, Cotman accompanied him to the capital, but in 1836 returned to Norwich to take over his brother Miles Edmund Cotman's art teaching work there as drawing master. He was a good teacher and artist of much original power, but suffered from periodical attacks of cerebral excitement followed by depression. These attacks became more frequent with age. In 1878 he was admitted to Norfolk and Norwich Hospital with cancer of the Tongue from which he died 15 March 1878, leaving a widow and several children. He Married Helen Anderson Cooper (1818-1899) produced 6 children: John Sell Edmund (1848-1902), Helen Isabella (1850-1922), Catherine Cooper (1851 1905) Harold Arthur in 1852, Duncan in 1853 and Edith Ann (1855-1917)

Cotman worked mostly in watercolour, painting, unlike his brother, in a rather loose, free manner.

He died in Norwich 15 March 1878.
