= John Sell Cotman =

English painter and etcher (1782–1842)

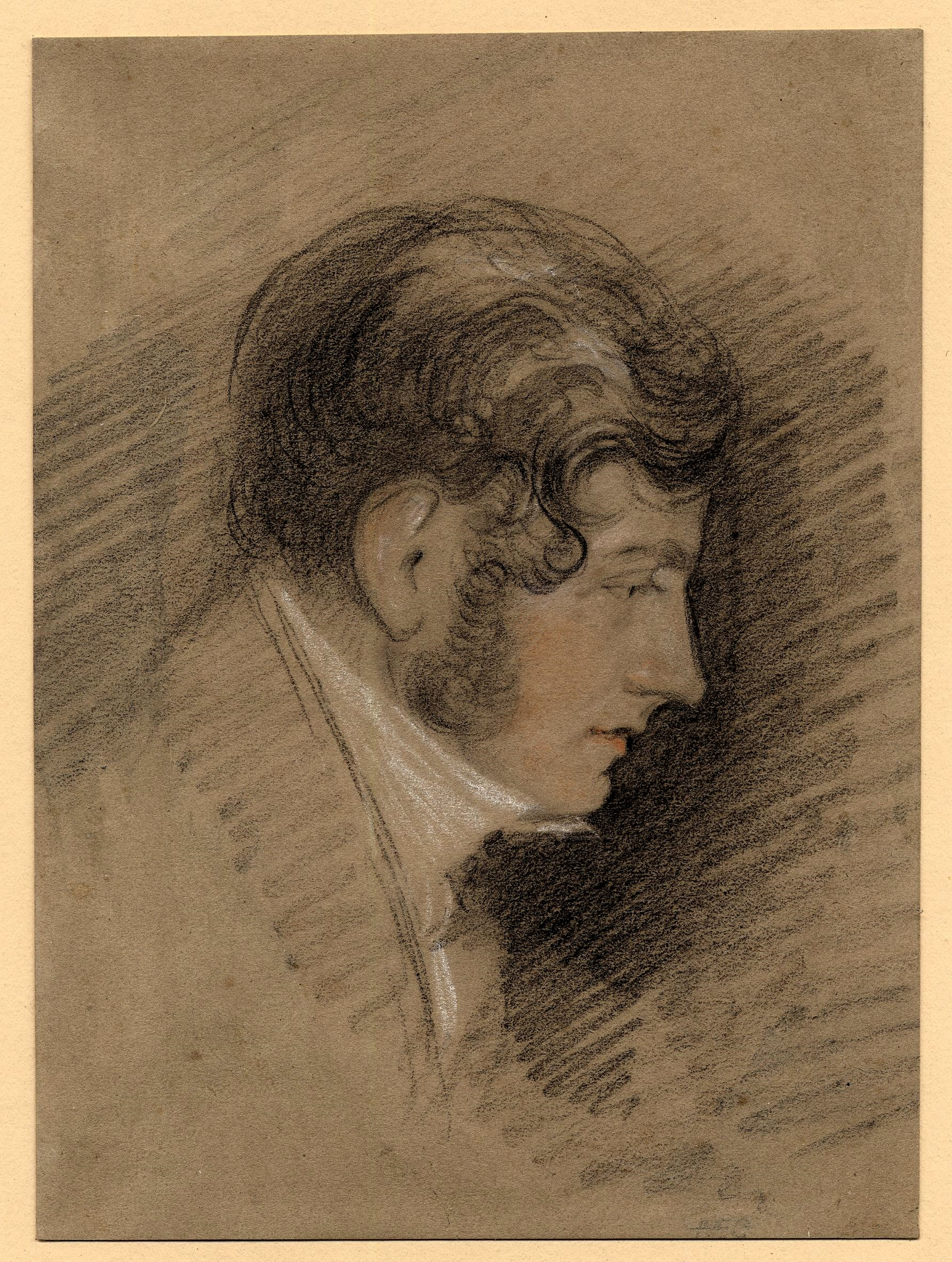
- Undated portrait by Miles Edmund Cotman, British Museum
- Born: 16 May 1782; Norwich, England
- Died: 24 May 1842 (aged 60); London, England
- Known for: Landscape painting
- Style: Romantic
- Movement: Norwich School of painters
- Children: Miles Edmund Cotman; John Joseph Cotman

John Sell Cotman (16 May 1782 – 24 July 1842) was an English marine and landscape painter, etcher, illustrator, and a leading member of the Norwich School of painters.

Born in Norwich, the son of a silk merchant and lace dealer, Cotman was educated at the Norwich Grammar School. He showed an early talent for art. It was intended that he followed his father into the family business but, intent on a career in art, he moved to London in 1798, where he met artists such as J. M. W. Turner, Peter de Wint and Thomas Girtin, whose sketching club he joined, and whom he travelled with to Wales and Surrey. By 1800 he was exhibiting at the Royal Academy, showing scenes of the Welsh countryside there in 1801 and 1802. His drawing expeditions took him throughout southern Britain, and to Yorkshire, where he stayed with the Cholmeley family during the three summers of 1803–1805.

His sons Miles Edmund and John Joseph Cotman became notable painters in their own right.

== Life ==
=== Early years ===
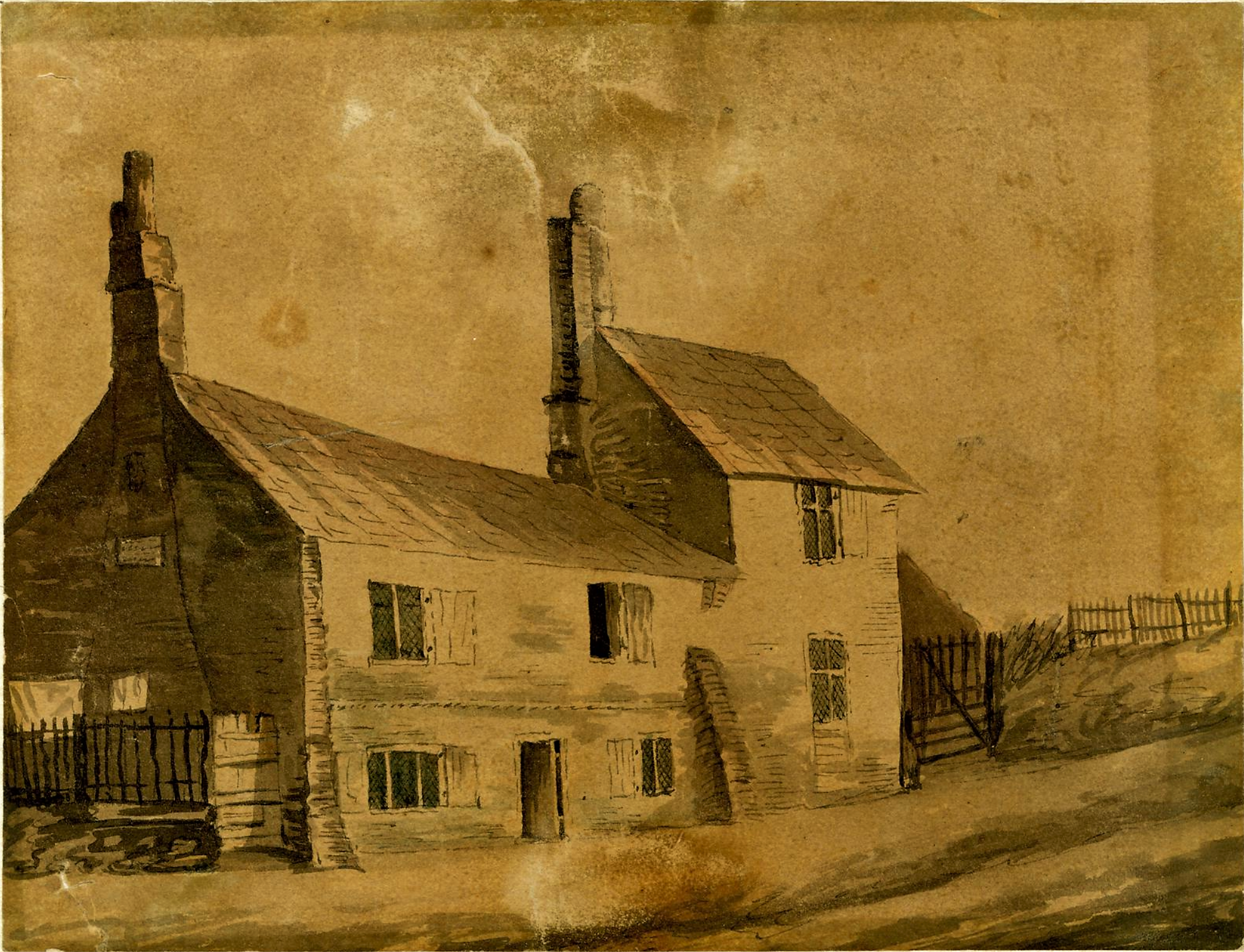
House at St Stephen's Road, Norwich (1794), British Museum, considered to be the earliest surviving work by Cotman

John Sell Cotman was born in Norwich, on 16 May 1782, the eldest child of Edmund Cotman and his wife Ann (née Sell) living at 26 Bridge Street, in St George's parish. Edmund Cotman was a hairdresser who later became a silk merchant and a lace dealer. Their son was baptised at St. Mary Coslany, Norwich, on 7 June 1782. The family name was written as Cottman in the parish baptism record, which has survived.

The young Cotman was educated at Norwich Grammar School, and is recorded as starting there as a non-paying pupil on 3 August 1793. He showed a talent for art from an early age and would often go out on drawing trips into the countryside around Norwich and the North Norfolk coast. A story survives that the boy's headmaster, Dr Samuel Forster, disliked cats. When Forster saw a large realistic-looking cardboard cat on his desk, he held the silhouette up, saying, "I know who is the only boy who could have drawn this."

Edmund Cotman intended his son to follow into the family business, but the boy was instead intent on a career in art. When asked for his advice, the artist John Opie replied to Cotman's father, "Let him rather black boots than follow the profession of an artist." A drawing from this period, House at St Stephen's Road, Norwich (1794), is considered to be the earliest surviving work by Cotman, sketched when he was 12.

=== London and Yorkshire ===
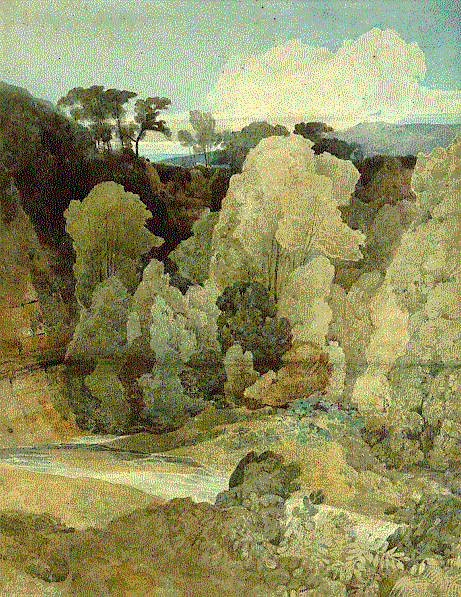
Devil's Elbow, Rokeby Park (c. 1806), Norfolk Museums Collections

Cotman moved to London, probably in 1798. He lived at 28 Gerrard Street, Soho, initially making a living through commissions from print-sellers. His sketches at Rudulph Ackerman's print shop at 96 The Strand were studied by the Norwich artist John Thirtle when a young man. Cotman came under the patronage of Thomas Munro, physician to the Bridewell and Bethlehem Hospitals, whose house in Adelphi Terrace was a studio and a meeting place for artists that had included the young J. M. W. Turner and Thomas Girtin.

Cotman was influenced by Girtin, and soon joined his sketching club. During the summer of 1799 the two artists travelled together south of London to Surrey on a drawing expedition. In 1800 (and again in 1802 with his landlord, the artist Paul Sandby Munn), Cotman travelled to Wales on a sketching trip.

In 1800, Cotman exhibited at the Royal Academy for the first time. He exhibited other Welsh scenes at the Royal Academy in 1801 and 1802. In 1800, he was awarded an honorary palette by the Society of Arts. He continued to exhibit at the Academy until 1806. He was based during the early 1800s in London, but is known to have advertised in Norwich—in September 1802 he advertised his services as a drawing teacher in the Norwich Mercury.

In the three summers of 1803–1805, Cotman stayed with the Cholmeley family at Brandsby Hall in Yorkshire. On the last of these three visits from London, (Note: During the early 1800s, Cotman's London address was 20, Woodstock Street.) he made a series of watercolours of the River Greta, after he was invited to visit Rokeby Park, the home of the English traveller John Morritt. Cotman's delicate paintings from these visits are among the finest produced by a European watercolourist.

=== Return to Norwich ===
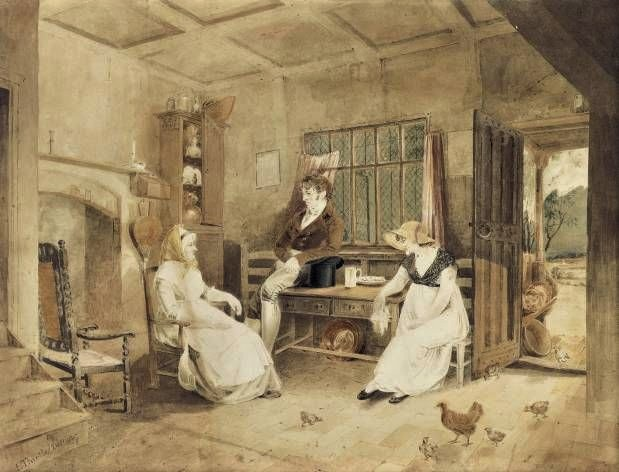
John Sell Cotman, Mrs Edmund Miles and Ann Miles in the Miles family farmhouse, Felbrigg, Norfolk by John Thirtle (1807), Norfolk Museums Collections

In late 1806, Cotman returned to live in Norwich. He joined the recently formed Norwich Society of Artists, and exhibited 149 works with the society between 1807 and 1810. He became the society's President in 1811.

Cotman married Ann Miles at Felbrigg parish church on 6 January 1809. The pair remained devoted throughout their married lives. Their eldest child Miles Edmund Cotman was born on 5 February the year after their marriage. Their daughter Ann was born in July 1812 after the family moved to Great Yarmouth in April 1812, followed by three more sons, John Joseph Cotman, (Francis) Walter, and Alfred Henry. who were born in 1814, 1816 and 1819 respectively. A sixth child, a daughter, was born in 1822.

As part of his teaching, Cotman operated his own version of a watercolour subscription library, so that his pupils could take home his drawings to copy. In 1810, Cotman began to etch, and the following year his first set of etchings (Miscellaneous Etchings) was published, strongly influenced by the work of the Italian artist Piranesi. All but one of the subjects were architectural, and were mostly of Yorkshire buildings. He later published a set of etchings of the ancient buildings of Norfolk (Architectural Antiquities of Norfolk (1818).

=== Move to Great Yarmouth ===
From 1812 to 1823, Cotman lived on the Norfolk coast at Great Yarmouth, where he studied the shipping, and mastered depicting the form of sea waves. Some of his finest marine pieces date from this time.

=== Normandy tours ===
External videos
- Cotman in Normandy: Curator's Lecture from Dulwich Picture Gallery

In 1817, 1818, and 1820, whilst Cotman was living in Great Yarmouth, he visited Normandy to make drawings of the landscape and buildings of the region. The three tours are well documented, as Cotman wrote letters about his travels to his wife, and to Dawson Turner, who made extensive use of them in A Tour of Normandy (1820). The idea for Cotman to tour Normandy came from his friend Dawson Turner, who had visited the region in September 1815 with the British artist Thomas Phillips to view the works of art taken to Paris by Napoleon.

Cotman went first to London, where he purchased a camera lucida from Sir Henry Englefield, and viewed the newly-installed Elgin Marbles at the British Museum. The camera lucida was used for all three of Cotman's tours, but he seems to have struggled to use it to depict buildings accurately:

I was a week drawing the front [of Rouen Cathedral] with a camera lucida,... but not knowing how to use it, I so misused it that I am afraid my labour is entirely lost, from getting different focuses.

Cotman sailed from Brighton to Dieppe on 18 July, and began exploring the area around Dieppe the following day. His first trip to Normandy lasted over five weeks. He described his accommodation during this trip as being of poor quality, and that the local population were openly hostile towards him. From the drawings he produced in Normandy he is apparent that he took sketch books and drawing equipment, but no painting materials.

The second trip took place the following year, and lasted seven weeks. During this trip Cotman was joined by Dawson Turner and his daughters, which made the time abroad more pleasant for them all. The third trip to Normandy in 1820 saw Cotman travelling to the southernmost part of the region, which captivated him. It allowed him to explore more of the countryside than he had done in previous years. An injury to his leg forced him to spend time recuperating in Caen.

Upon returning home to Great Yarmouth, Cotman worked tirelessly to produce the etchings needed for Dawson Turner's Architectural Antiquities of Normandy, which was published in 1822. The project enhanced the artist's reputation, and he became as famous as he was ever to become during his lifetime. Two years later Dawson Turner published Cotman's 100 etchings based on his sketches, with notes produced from Cotman's letters.

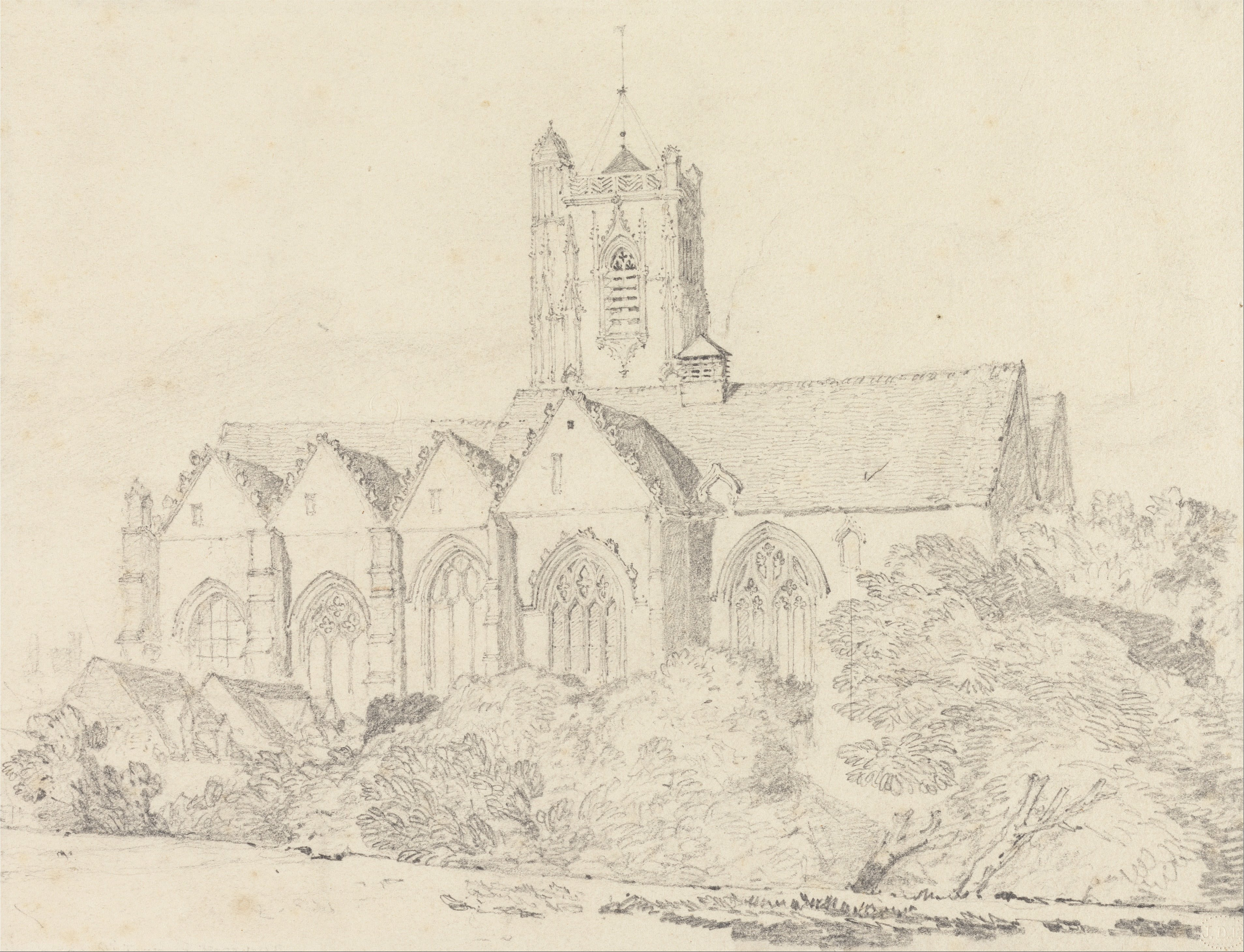
The Church of St. John, Peronne (Somme) (undated), Yale Center for British Art

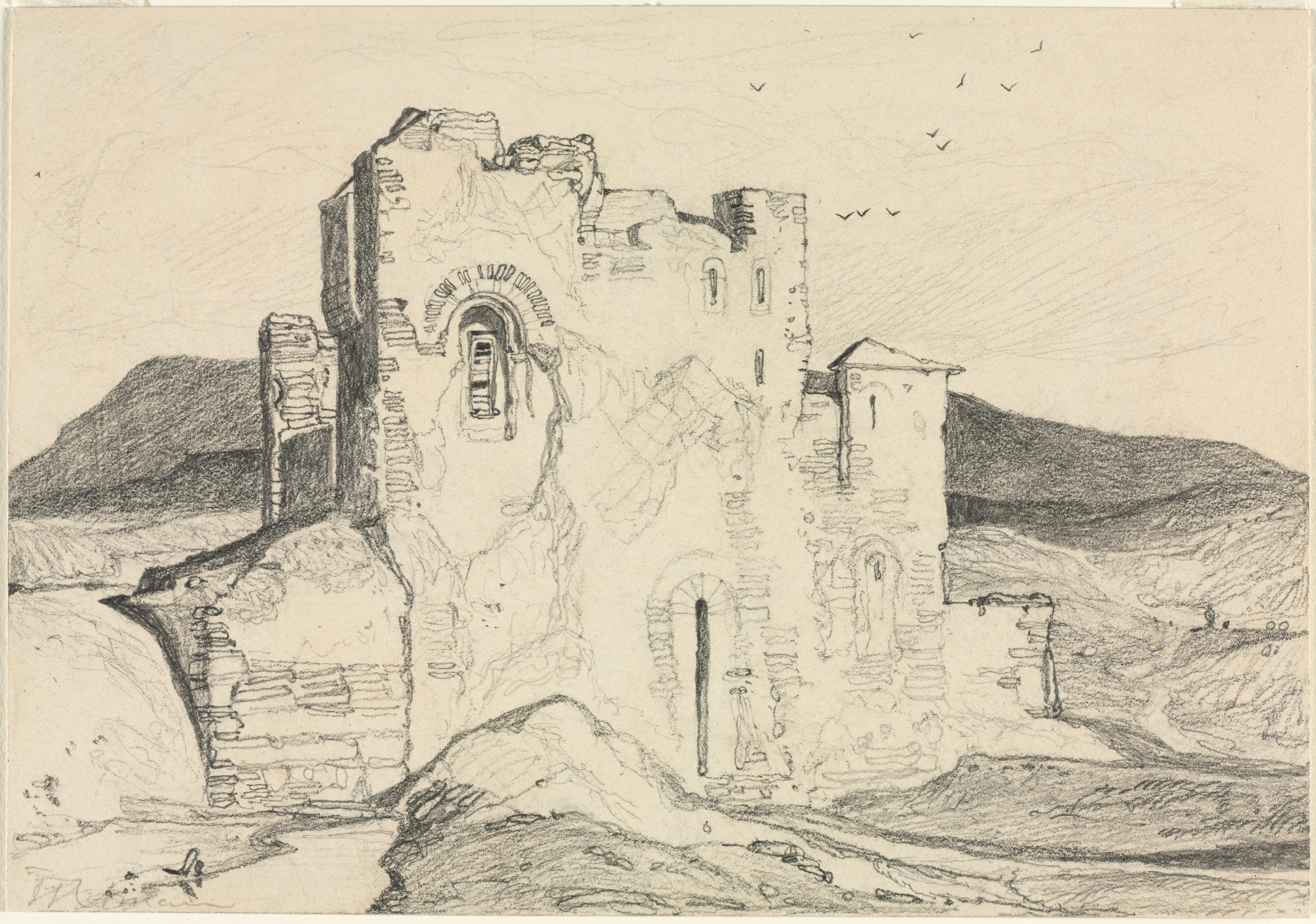
A Castle in Normandy (undated), Cleveland Museum of Art

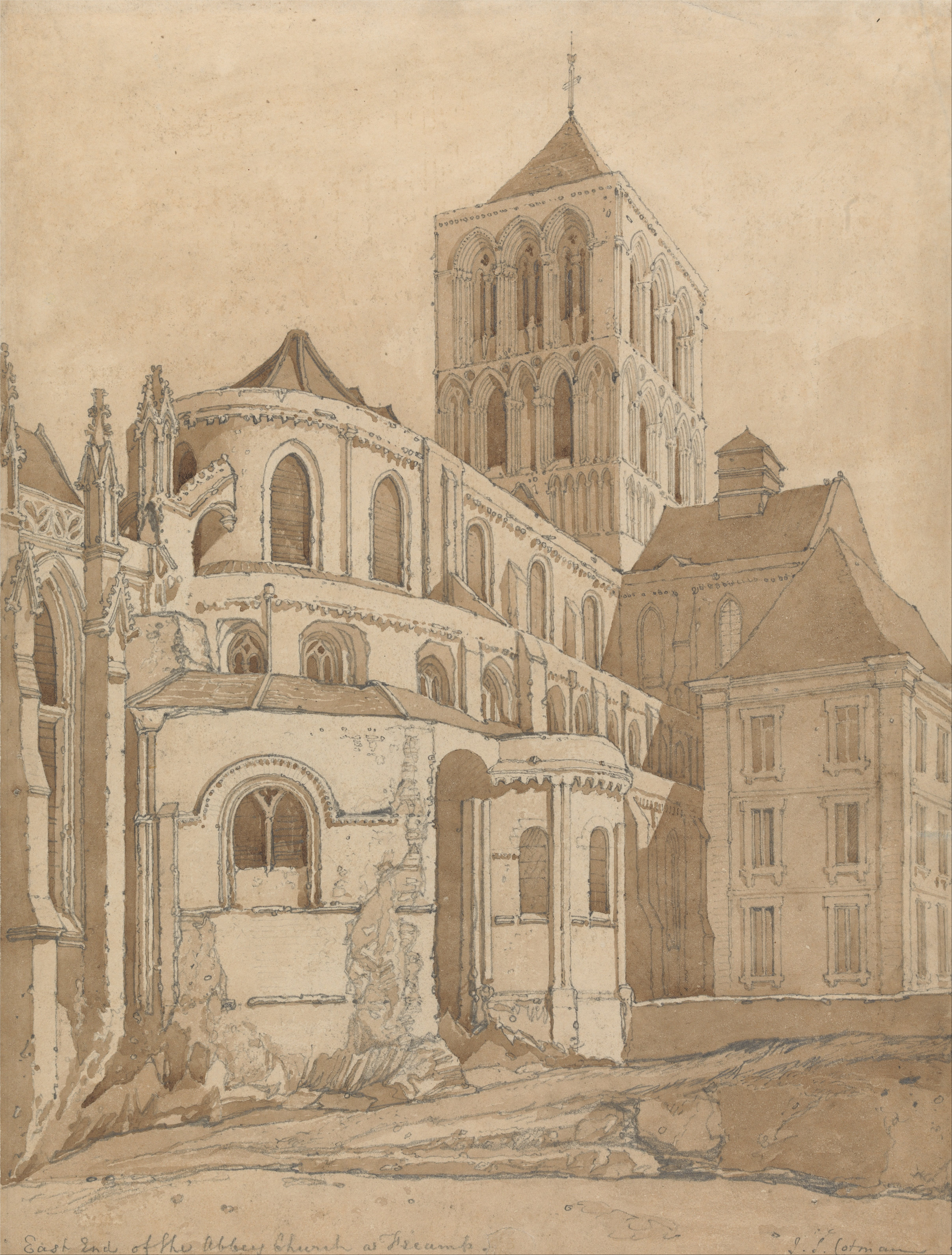
Abbey Church at Fecamp, Normandy (c. 1818), Yale Center for British Art

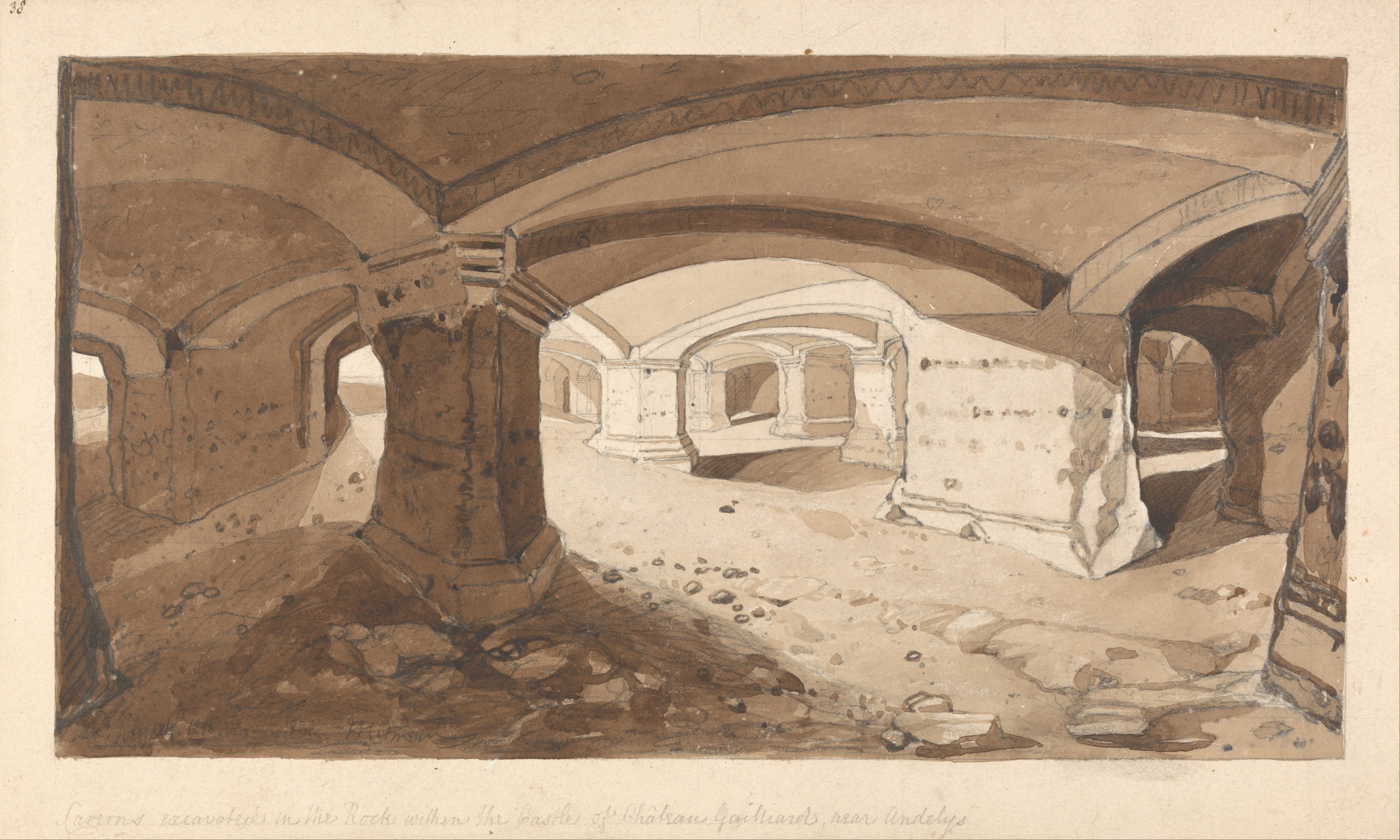
Caverns Excavated in the Rock within the Castle of Chateau Gaillard, near Andelys, Normandy (1822), Yale Center for British Art

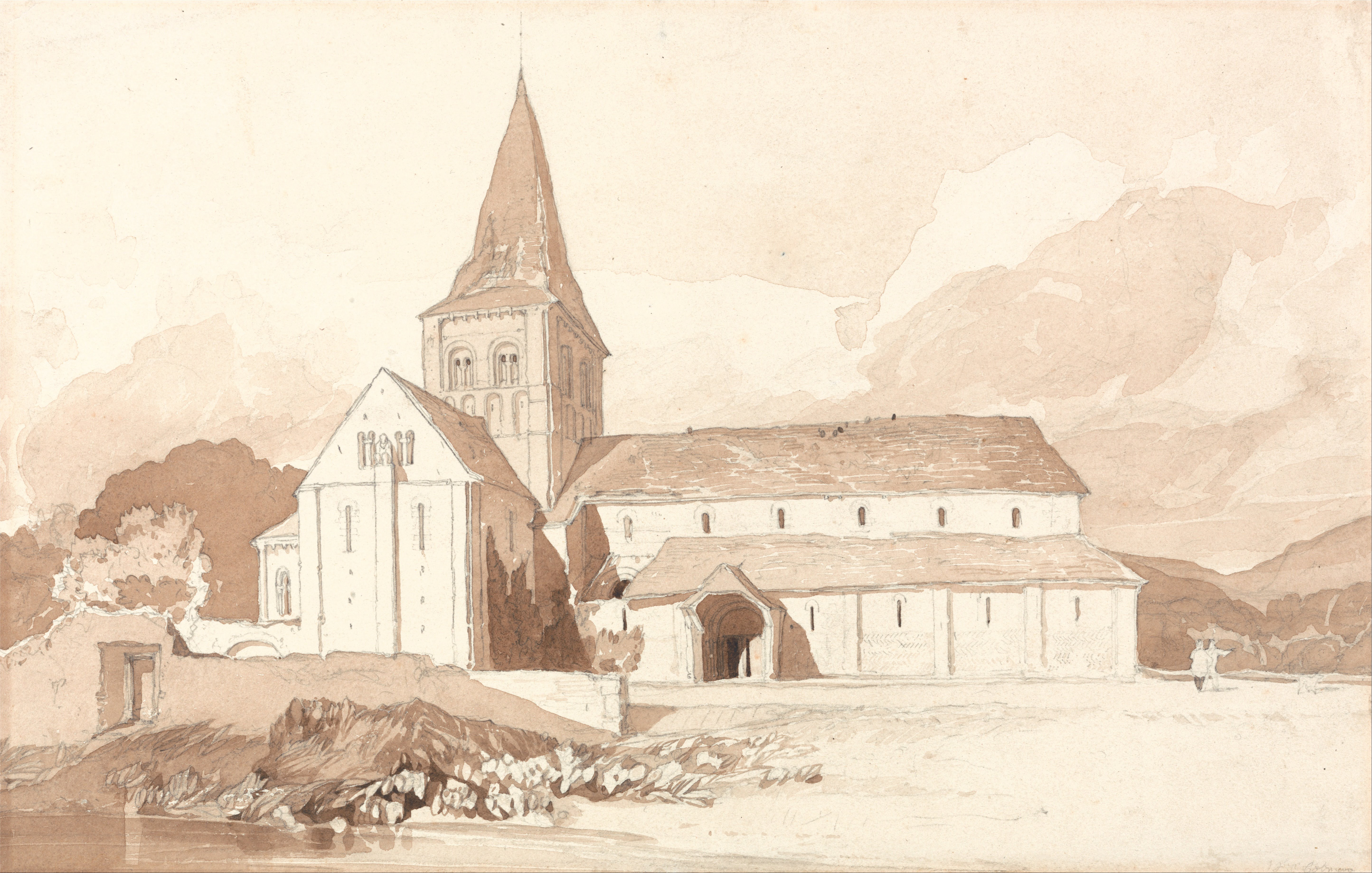
Notre Dame sur l'Eau, Domfront, Normandy (c. 1820), Yale Center for British Art

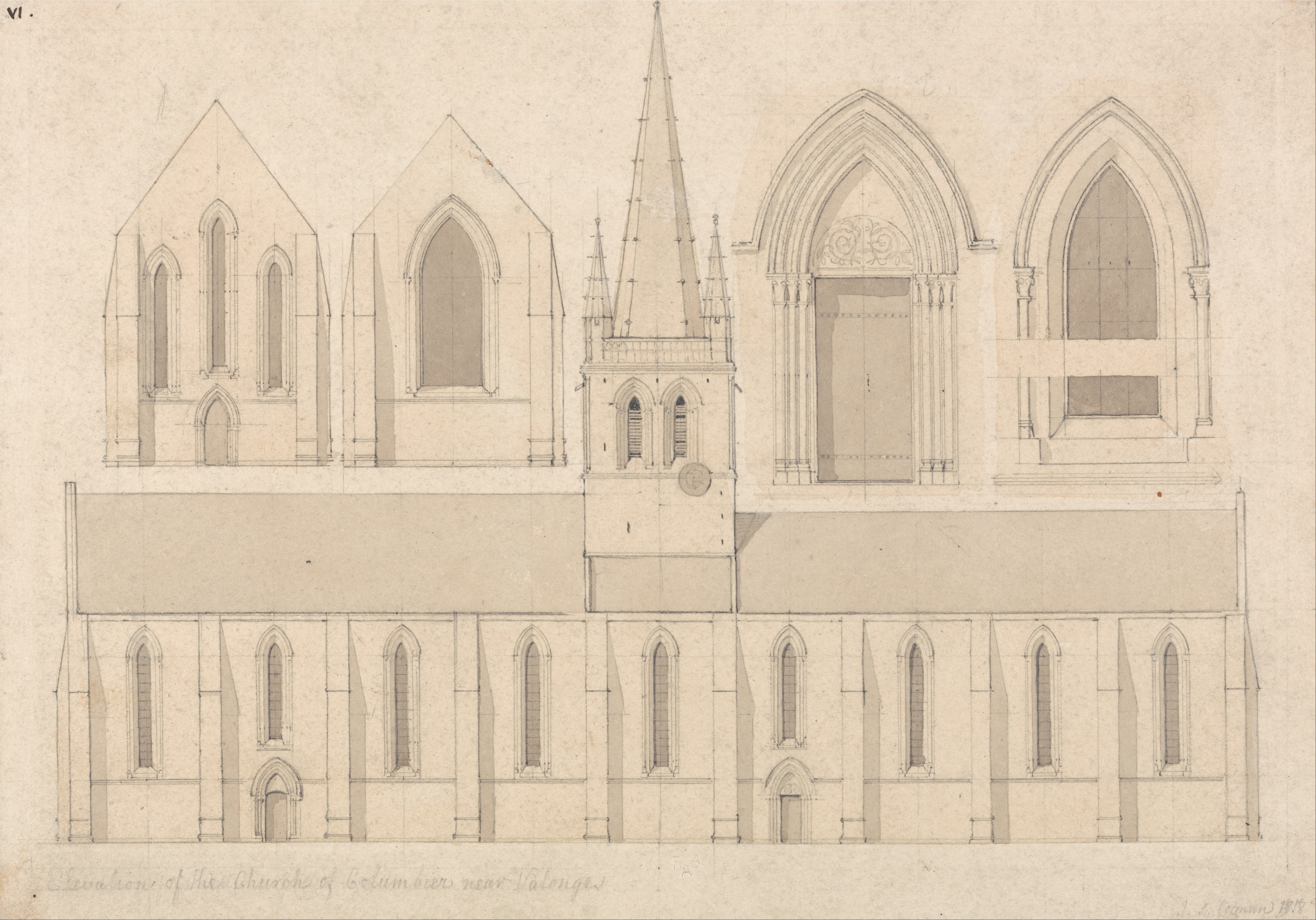
Elevation of the Church of Columbiers, near Valognes, Normandy (1818), Yale Center for British Art

=== Return to Norwich ===
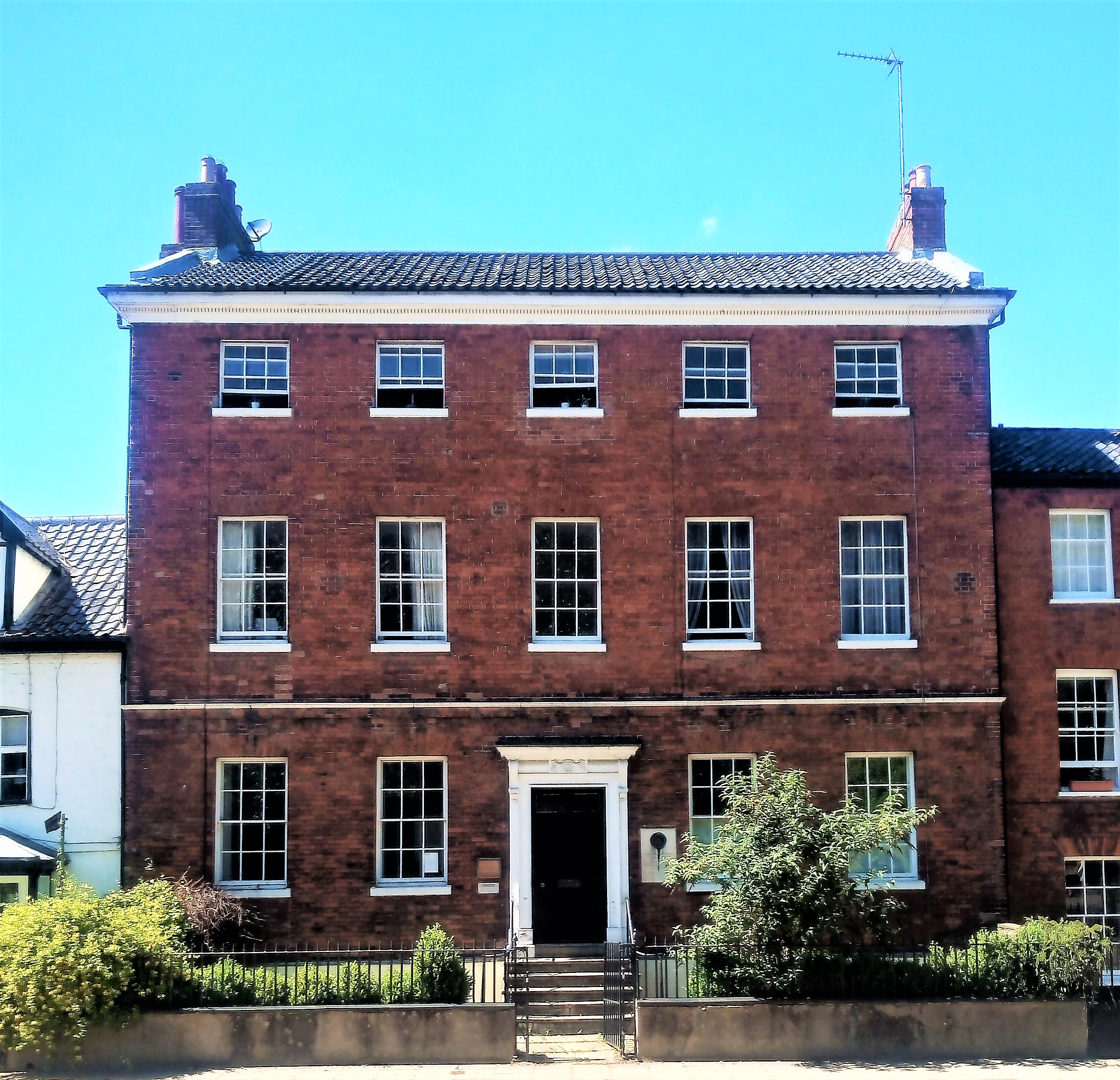
Cotman's house in St Martin's Plain, Norwich

Cotman returned to Norwich in 1824, hoping to improve his financial position, and moved into a large house in St Martin's Plain, opposite the Bishop's Palace, where he built up a collection of prints, books, armour, and models of ships, to aid his compositions. He showed work from 1823 to 1825 at the Norwich Society of Artists' annual exhibitions.

In 1825, Cotman became an Associate of the Royal Society of Painters in Watercolours and was a frequent exhibitor there until 1839. During this period in his career he was driven to despair by his constant financial struggles.

=== King's College, London ===
In January 1834, Cotman was appointed Master of landscape drawing at King's College School in London, partly on the recommendation of J.M.W. Turner. In 1836 Miles Edmund Cotman was appointed to assist his father. The poet and artist Dante Gabriel Rossetti was one of his pupils. In London, Cotman developed friendships with the artists James Stark, George Cattermole, Samuel Prout, and Cornelius Varley. In 1836, he became an honorary member of the Institute of British Architects. In 1838, all of his etchings were published by Henry George Bohn.

In 1834, Miles Edmund remained in Norwich to work as an art teacher, when the rest of the Cotman family moved to London upon Cotman's appointment at King's College. A year after his move to London, Mile Edmund moved to London to be his father's assistant, after his brother John Joseph returned to Norwich. Miles Edmund succeeded his father as drawing master at King's College in 1843.

=== Final years ===
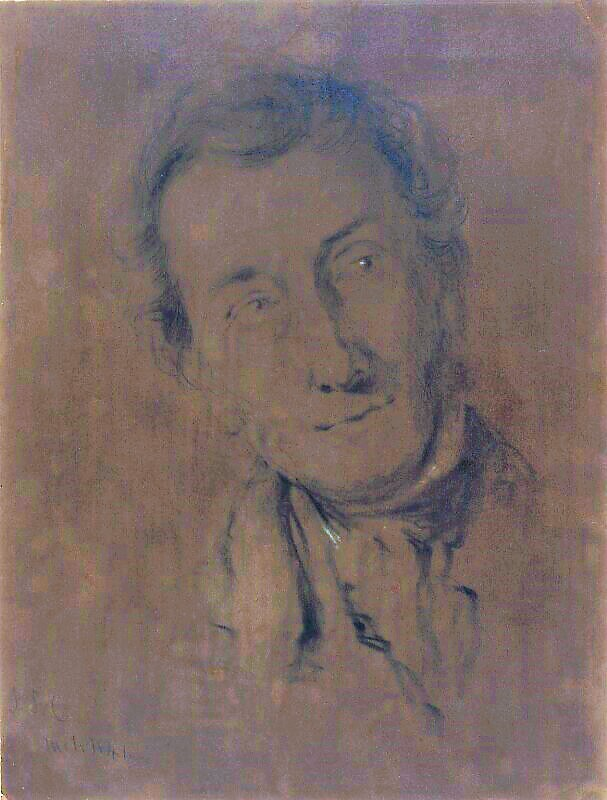
John Joseph Cotman's chalk drawing of his father, made during his last visit to Norfolk in 1841, National Portrait Gallery, London

From 1839, Cotman became severely depressed, a condition that lasted into 1841. That year, he resumed his correspondence with Dawson Turner. Granted a fortnight's leave from King's College, he journeyed from London to Great Yarmouth by ship and then on to Norwich, ultimately staying in Norfolk for two months before returning to the capital. He produced some chalk drawings of church interiors, and of the Norfolk countryside, the dates of which allow his journey around the county to be traced: his sketches included Itteringham, 12 November and Storm off Cromer. During this period he was able to visit his elderly father at Thorpe St Andrew outside Norwich, when he probably began preparatory work for a painting, entitled From my Father's House at Thorpe. His last oil painting—dated 18 January 1842 and never completed—was A View of the Norwich River.

Cotman's depression returned, and by June 1842 he had become seriously ill, dying "of natural decay" on 24 July 1842. He was interred in the cemetery of St John's Wood Chapel, London. In his will he left everything to his wife Ann, and enabled her to receive a pension. His paintings and drawings were sold off from May 1843, fetching lower and lower prices for his financially-troubled family as the sales continued.

== Paintings, drawings, and etchings ==
Over 600 of Cotman's watercolours and drawings were bought by the Norwich curator James Reeve, who sold more than half of them to the British Museum in 1902. The remainder of Reeve's collection was acquired by the Norwich Castle from the collection of the Norfolk industrialist Russell Colman. Some of Cotman's paintings, etchings, and drawings are on public display in Norwich, where well over 2,000 works are held. Other works are at the Leeds Art Gallery, the Tate Gallery, the British Museum and the Victoria and Albert Museum, the Fitzwilliam Museum in Cambridge, and other regional centres. In the United States, there are works by Cotman at the Yale Center for British Art in New Haven, Connecticut, and in other galleries around the country.

Cotman was not thought to be important during his lifetime, and he made little money from sales of his paintings and drawings. The sale of his works and library took place over five days at Christie's. His drawings and pictures fetched £260, his collection of books and art was sold off for £300 and the sum total for his prints was £30.

Cotman's architectural etchings have long been considered as a valuable record for historians.

== Published works ==
- 1811 Etchings by John Sell Cotman (London)
- 1817: Specimens of Norman and Gothic Architecture in the County of Norfolk (Great Yarmouth)
- 1818: Excursions in the County of Norfolk - volume 1 (London)
- 1819: Excursions in the County of Norfolk - volume 2 (London)
- 1819: Sepulchral brasses in Norfolk and Suffolk, volumes 1 - Norfolk and 2 - Suffolk (London)
- 1820: A Tour of Normandy (London, 2 volumes by Dawson Turner with illustrations by Cotman). Turner made use of letters written to him by Cotman during his sketching tours of Normandy.
- 1822: Architectural Antiquities of Normandy (London)
- 1838: Liber Studiorum (produced between 1805 and 1814)

== Reputation and legacy ==
Cotman and Crome were the two finest of the Norwich School of painters, who were both recognised by the public during their lives, with Cotman's Architectural Antiquities of Normandy bringing him wider praise. The architect Augustus Pugin, in his Specimens of Gothic Architecture (1823), mixed praise and criticism

[the plates] are drawn and etched in a masterly style, but with a good deal of management, by which the subjects appear, in several instances, of grander character than really belongs to them...In some Plates also, the human figures are evidently below the size of life, and so exaggerate the size of the buildings they are placed against.

The art historian Andrew Moore, describes the artists as "two of the most original talents in the history of early nineteenth century British art", and that they were rivalled only by Turner, Girtin, and the English artist John Constable. The 1887 edition of the Dictionary of National Biography noted that Cotman's reputation had improved over time, and described him as "one of the most original and versatile of English artists of the first half of this century, a draughtsman and colourist of exceptional gifts, a water-colourist worthy to be ranked among the greater men, and excellent whether as a painter of land or sea".

In 1888 the Norwich Art Circle showed 100 of Cotman's works at Norwich, the first time his collected works had been exhibited. This event led to a critical appraisal of his output and secured a second exhibition that year at the Burlington Fine Arts Club.

The art historians Lawrence Binyon and William Dickes both wrote extensively about Cotman's oil paintings and watercolours. Cotman's oils were first exhibited when they were shown at the Tate Gallery, London in 1922. According to his biographer Sydney Decimus Kitson, Cotman's reputation was enhanced by The Water-Colour Drawings of John Sell Cotman by Paul Oppé, which appeared in a special edition of The Studio in 1923.

Cotman's reputation has been hidden by misinformation, and by works that were misattributed. Among his pupils, the most notable were Thirtle and his own sons.

== Gallery ==
=== Watercolours ===
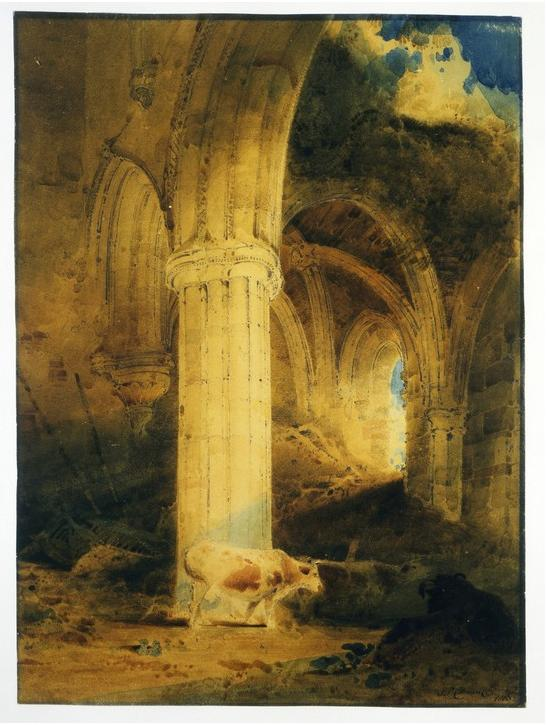
Ruins of Rievaulx Abbey, Yorkshire (1803), Victoria and Albert Museum

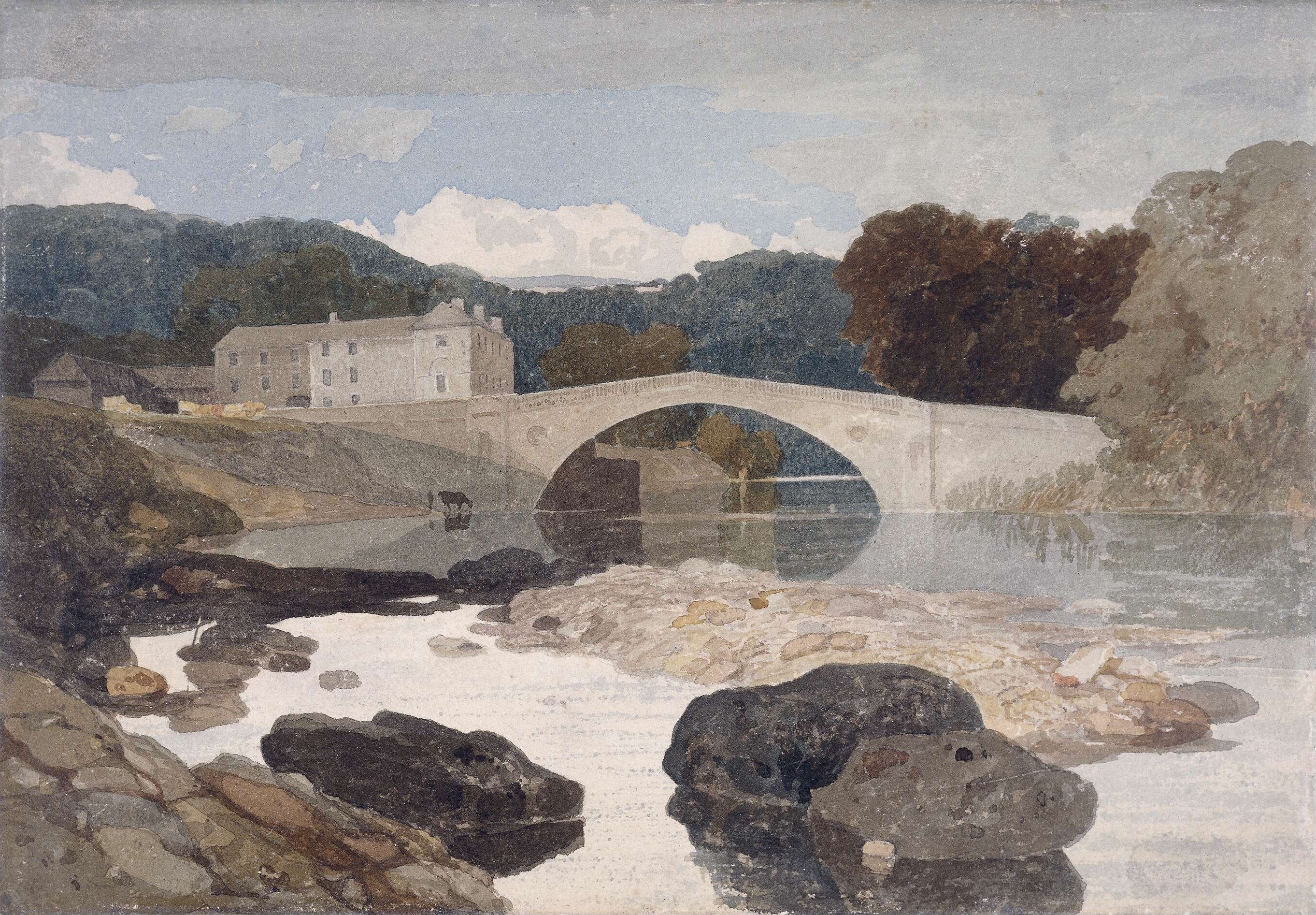
Greta Bridge (1805), British Museum

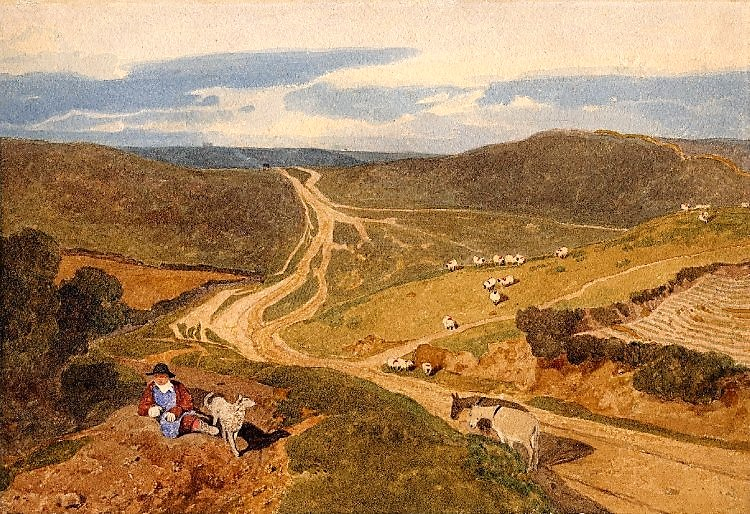
Mousehold Heath (1810), British Museum

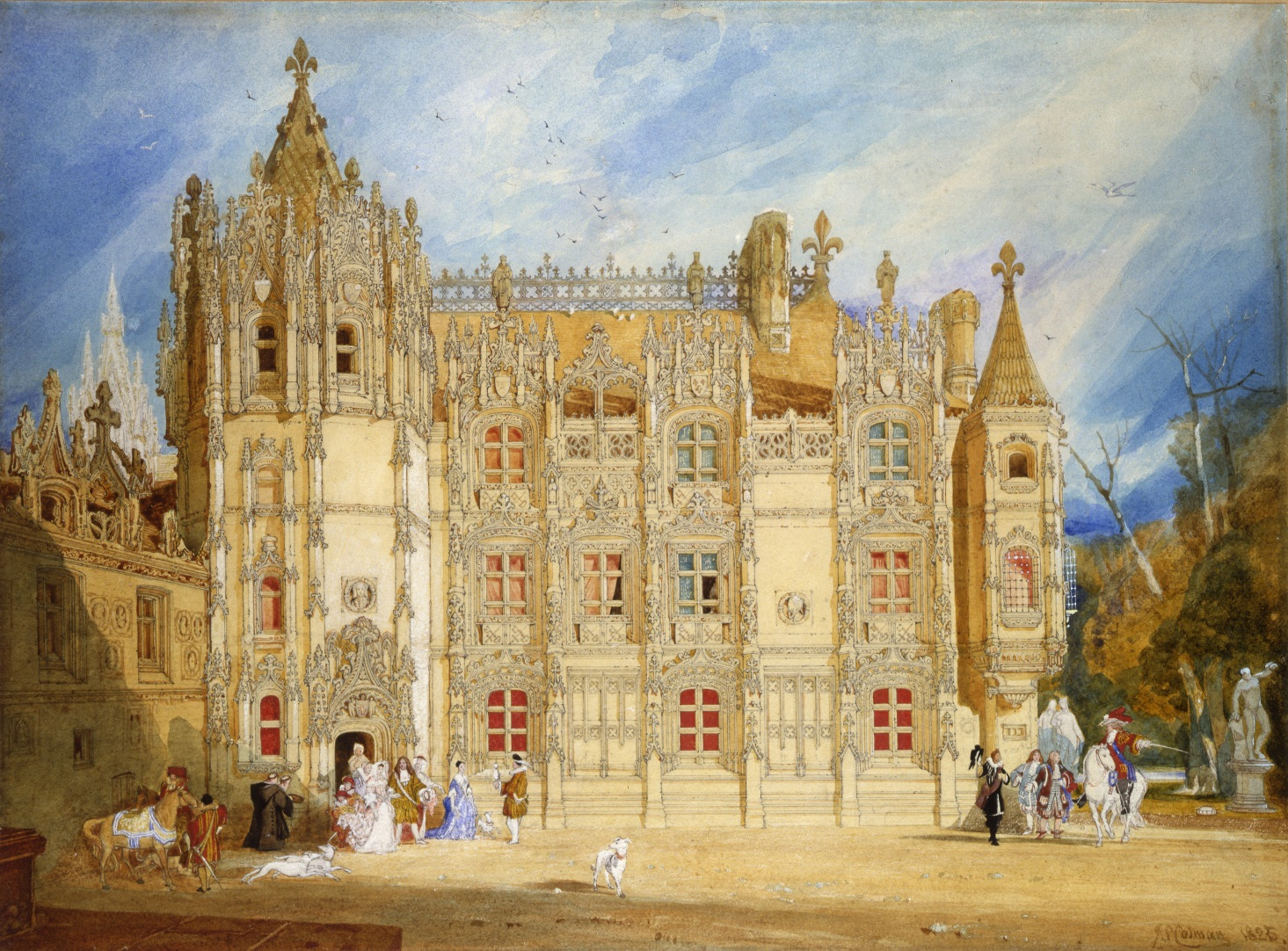
Abbatial House of the Abbey of St Ouen at Rouen (1825), Norfolk Museums Collections

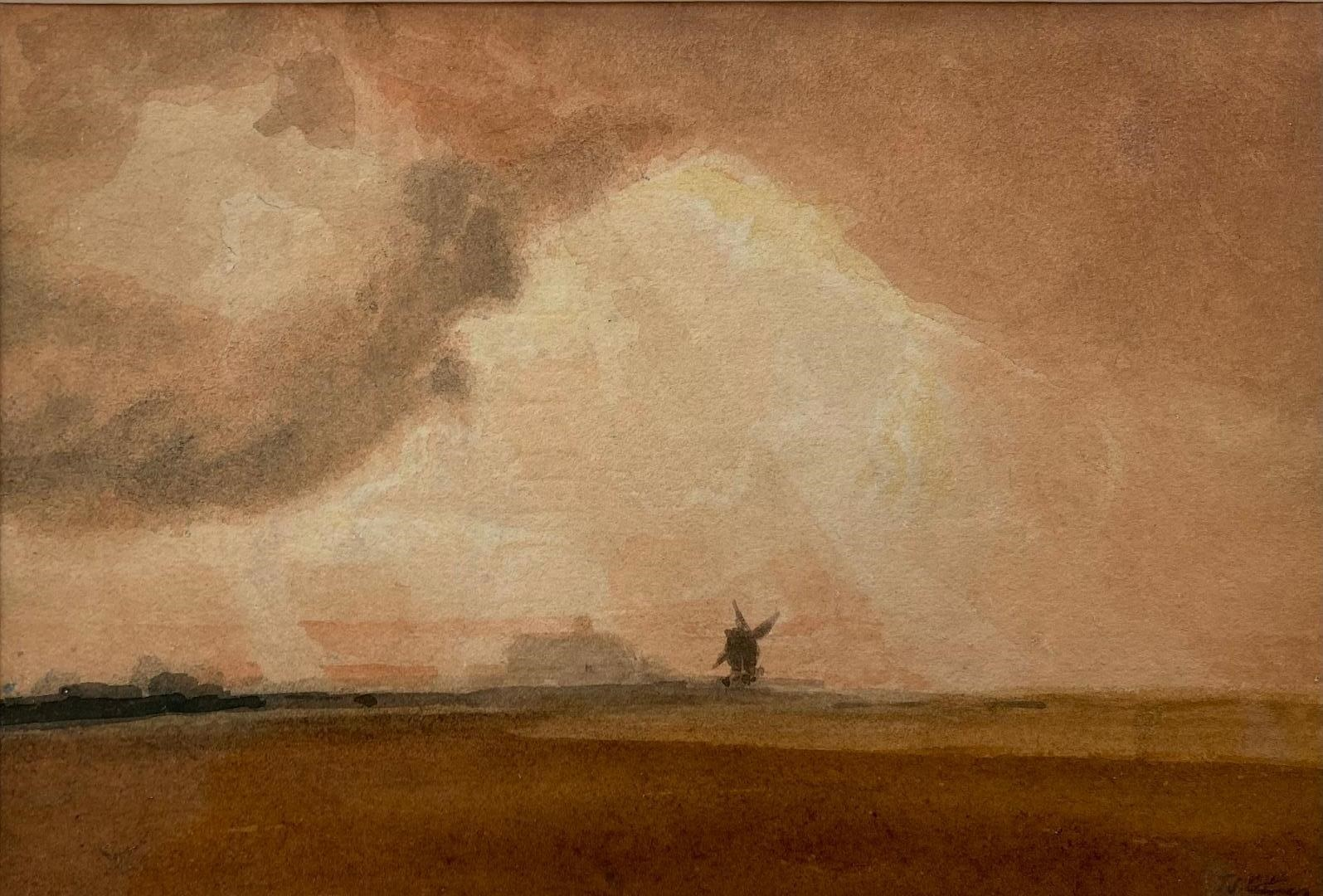
Windmill, Norfolk. Watercolour (10 cm x 15 cm), private collection.

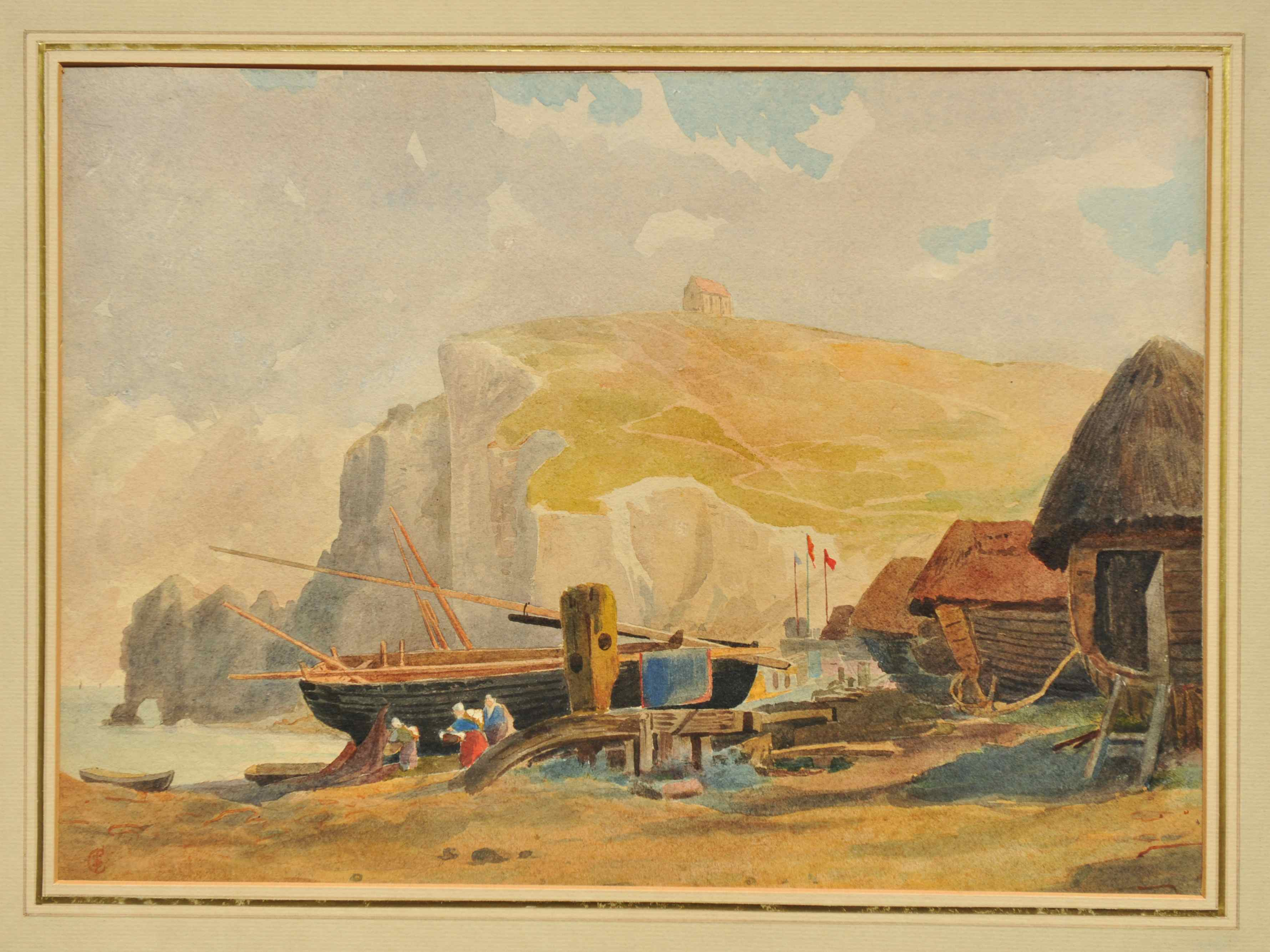
Etretat, Normandy. Sketched about 28 July 1820, private collection.

=== Oils, drawings, and etchings ===
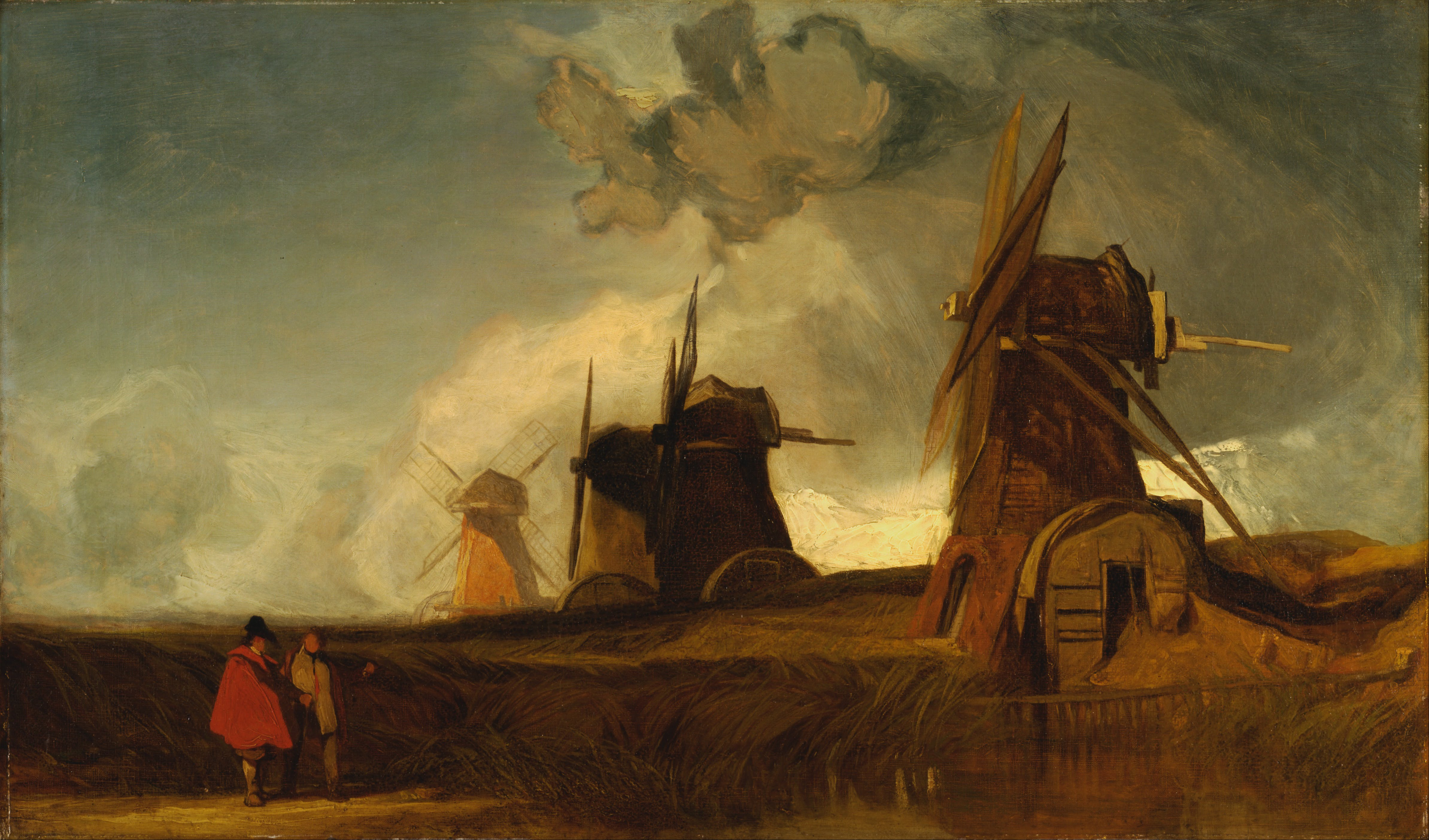
Drainage Mills in the Fens, Croyland, Lincolnshire (c. 1835), Yale Center for British Art

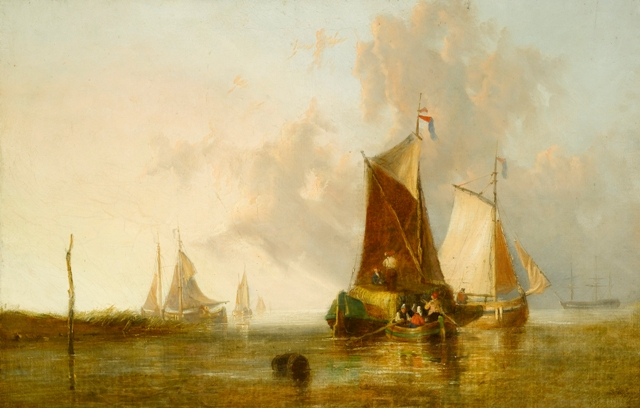
The Mouth of the Yare

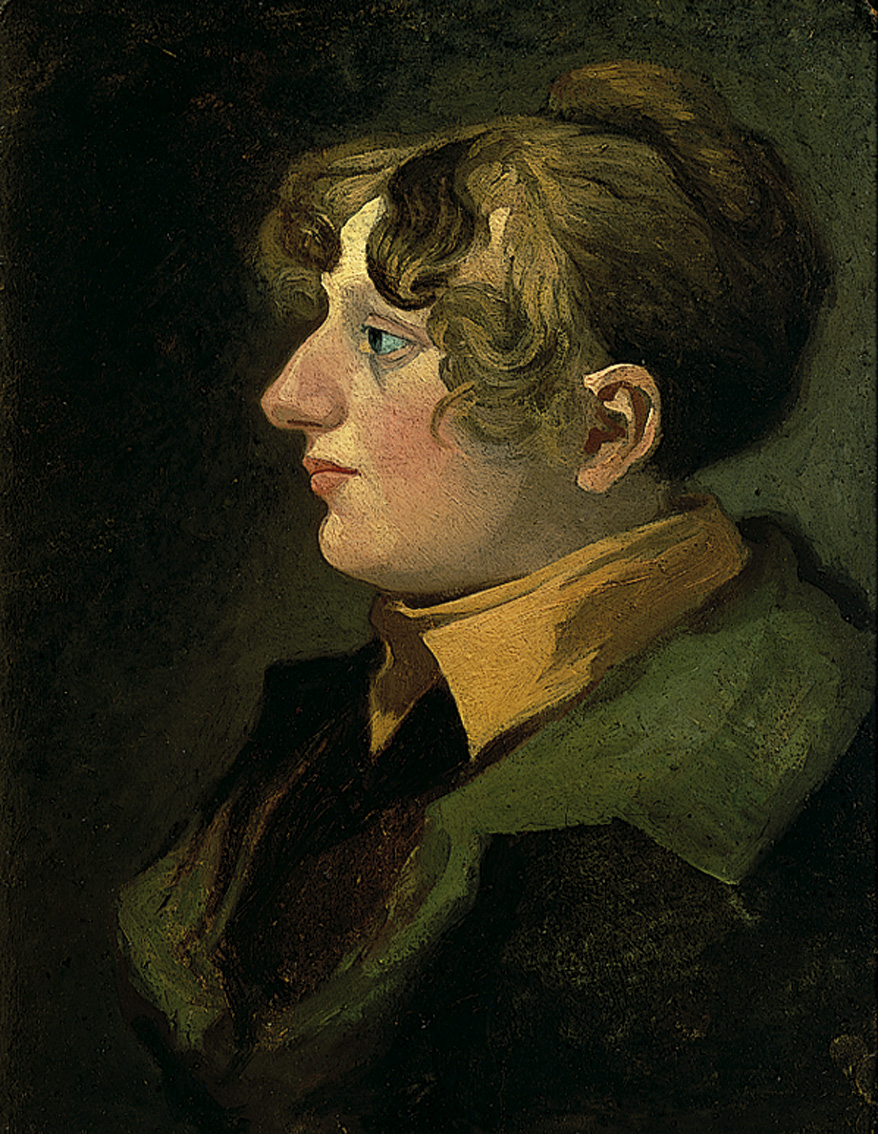
Portrait of Mrs John Sell Cotman (c. 1808), Norfolk Museums Collections

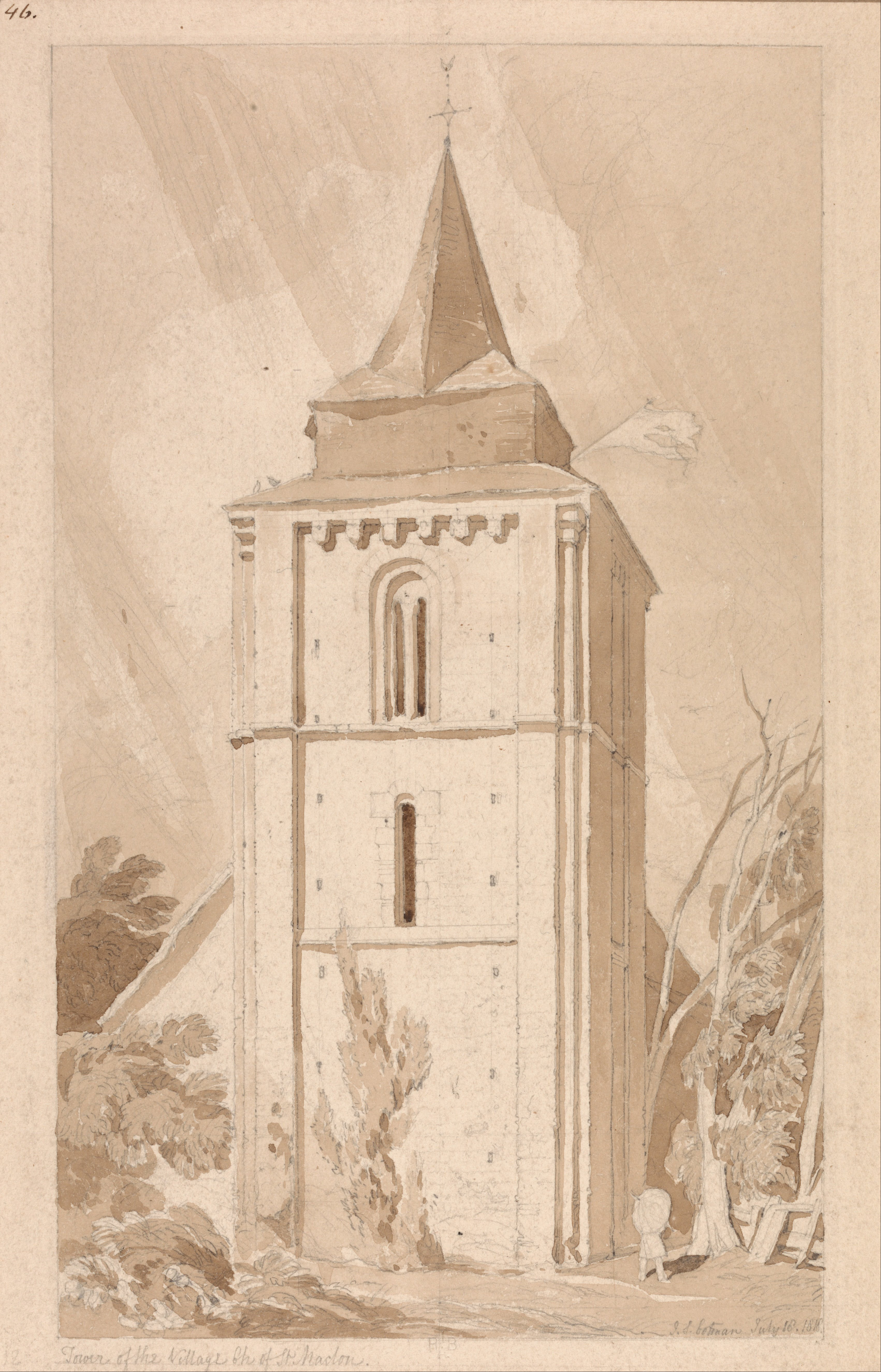
Tower of the Village Church of Saint Maclou, Normandy (1818), Yale Center for British Art

== Bibliography ==
- Binyon, Laurence (1897). "John Sell Cotman". John Crome and John Sell Cotman. London: Seeley & Co. LCCN 10012634.
- Chisholm, Hugh, ed. (1911). "Cotman, John Sell". Encyclopædia Britannica. Vol. 7 (11th ed.). Cambridge University Press.
- Clifford, Derek Plint (1965). Watercolours of the Norwich School. Cory, Adams & Mackay. ISBN 978-0-239-00015-6. OCLC 1624701.
- Cundall, Herbert Minton (1920). Holme, Geoffrey (ed.). The Norwich School. London: The Studio Ltd. OCLC 472125860.
- Dickes, William Frederick (1905). The Norwich school of painting: being a full account of the Norwich exhibitions, the lives of the painters, the lists of their respective exhibits and descriptions of the pictures. Norwich: Jarrold & Sons Ltd. OCLC 558218061.
- Hemingway, Andrew (1980). "The English Piranesi: Cotman's Architectural Prints". The Volume of the Walpole Society. 48: 210–244. JSTOR 41827699.
- Hill, David (2005). Cotman in the North: Watercolours of Durham and Yorkshire. New Haven, Connecticut; London: Yale University Press. ISBN 978-0-300-10704-3.
- Holcomb, Adele M. (1978). John Sell Cotman. London: British Museum. ISBN 978-07141-8-005-2.
- Kitson, Sydney D. (1937). The Life of John Sell Cotman. London: Faber & Faber. OCLC 1017287302.
- Lyles, Anne; Hamlyn, Robin (1997). British Watercolours from the Oppé Collection. London: Tate Gallery. OCLC 39887257.
- Moore, Andrew W. (1982). John Sell Cotman: 1782-1842. Norwich, UK: Norwich Museums Service. ISBN 0903101424.
- Moore, Andrew W. (1985). The Norwich School of Artists. Norwich, UK: His Majesty's Stationery Office/Norwich Museums Service. ISBN 978-0-903101-48-6.
- Moore, Andrew W. (2008). "Cotman, John Sell (1782–1842)". Oxford Dictionary of National Biography (online ed.). Oxford University Press. doi:10.1093/ref:odnb/6390. (Subscription, Wikipedia Library access or UK public library membership required.)
- Rajnai, Miklós (1982). John Sell Cotman, 1782-1842. Ithaca, N.Y.: Cornell University Press. ISBN 978-0-8014-1520-3.
- Stephen, Leslie, ed. (1887). "Cotman, John Sell" . Dictionary of National Biography. Vol. 12. London: Smith, Elder & Co. pp. 285–287.
- Walpole, Josephine (1997). Art and Artists of the Norwich School. Woodbridge: Antique Collectors' Club. ISBN 978-0-9559320-4-5.
