= List of schools in Telford and Wrekin =

This is a list of schools in Telford and Wrekin in the English county of Shropshire.

== State-funded schools ==
=== Primary schools ===
- Allscott Meads Primary, Allscott
- Apley Wood Primary School, Hadley
- Aqueduct Primary School, Aqueduct
- Captain Webb Primary School, Dawley
- Church Aston Infant School, Church Aston
- Coalbrookdale and Ironbridge CE Primary School, Coalbrookdale
- Crudgington Primary School, Crudgington
- Dawley CE Primary Academy, Dawley
- Donnington Wood CE Junior School, Donnington
- Donnington Wood Infant School, Donnington
- Dothill Primary School, Wellington
- Grange Park Primary School, Stirchley
- Hadley Learning Community, Hadley
- High Ercall Primary School, High Ercall
- Hollinswood Primary School, Hollinswood
- Holmer Lake Primary School, Brookside
- John Fletcher Of Madeley Primary School, Madeley
- John Randall Primary School, Madeley
- Ladygrove Primary School, Dawley
- Lantern Academy, Ketley Bank
- Lawley Primary School, Lawley
- Lawley Village Academy, Lawley
- Lightmoor Village Primary School, Lightmoor
- Lilleshall Primary School, Lilleshall
- Meadows Primary School, Ketley
- Millbrook Primary School, Leegomery
- Moorfield Primary School, Newport
- Muxton Primary School, Muxton
- Newdale Primary School, Newdale
- Newport CE Junior School, Newport
- Newport Infant School, Newport
- Old Park Primary School, Malinslee
- Priorslee Academy, Priorslee
- Randlay Primary School, Randlay
- Redhill Primary Academy, Priorslee
- St Georges CE Primary School, St Georges
- St Lawrence CE Primary School, Preston upon the Weald Moors
- St Luke's RC Primary School, Trench
- St Mary's RC Primary School, Madeley
- St Matthew's CE Primary School, Donnington
- St Patrick's RC Primary School, Wellington
- St Peter and Paul RC Primary School, Newport
- St Peter's CE Academy, Bratton
- St Peter's CE Primary School, Edgmond
- Short Wood Primary School, Wellington
- Sir Alexander Fleming Primary School, Sutton Hill
- Teagues Bridge Primary School, Trench
- Tibberton Primary School, Tibberton
- William Reynold's Primary School, Woodside
- Windmill Primary School, Brookside
- Wombridge Primary School, Oakengates
- Woodlands Primary School, Madeley
- Wrekin View Primary School, Wellington
- Wrockwardine Wood CE Junior School, Wrockwardine Wood
- Wrockwardine Wood Infant School, Wrockwardine Wood

=== Non-selective secondary schools ===
- Burton Borough School, Newport
- Charlton School, Wellington
- Ercall Wood Academy, Wellington
- Haberdashers' Abraham Darby, Madeley
- Hadley Learning Community, Hadley
- Holy Trinity Academy, Priorslee
- Madeley Academy, Madeley
- The Telford Langley School, Dawley
- Telford Park School, Stirchley
- New Road Academy
- Thomas Telford School, Telford Town Centre

=== Grammar schools ===
- Haberdashers' Adams, Newport
- Newport Girls' High School, Newport

=== Special and alternative schools ===
- The Bridge at HLC, Hadley
- Haughton School, Madeley
- Kickstart Academy, Wellington
- Queensway, Dawley
- Southall School, Dawley

=== Further education ===
- Telford College

== Independent schools ==
=== Primary and preparatory schools ===
- Castle House School, Newport
- The Old Hall School, Wellington

=== Senior and all-through schools ===
- Wrekin College, Wellington

=== Special and alternative schools ===
- Aspris Telford School, Coalbrookdale
- Overley Hall School, Wellington
- The Retreat, Ercall Heath
- Rodenhurst School, Rodington
- The Seeds School, Horsehay

== See also ==
- List of schools in Shropshire
