= Imran Sheikh =

Indian deaf cricketer

Personal information
- Born: 1985
- Nickname: Dhoni of the Indian national deaf and mute cricket team
- Role: all-rounder

Imran Sheikh (born 1985) is an Indian deaf cricketer and a Kachori vendor. He served as the former captain of the Indian deaf cricket team from 2012 to 2017. He was also a member of the Indian team which won the 2005 Deaf Cricket World Cup. He is often known as the Dhoni of the Indian deaf cricket team mainly for his ability to strike the ball harder and for being a regular finisher for the national deaf cricket team. He has the inability to speak and hear as he uses sign language to communicate.

== Career ==
Imran is about 6 feet tall in height and started playing cricket at the age of 15.

Imran Sheikh is regarded as one of the most experienced deaf cricketers to have played for the Indian national deaf cricket team as he was part of the national team for more than 15 years. He is notable for his great strokeplays which helped India to secure the Deaf Cricket World Cup in 2005. During the 2005 World Cup, he chipped in with some good innings including a knock of 70 runs against New Zealand in a group stage match and a crucial knock of 62 runs against arch-rivals Pakistan in the semifinals of the tournament. He continued his good form with the bat in the finals by notching a match winning 40 runs against England and also claimed 3 wickets to secure the Deaf Cricket World Cup title for India.

He too led the Indian team which won the 2017 Deaf T20 Asia Cup defeating Sri Lanka by 156 runs in the finals.

== Post cricket ==
As the blind and deaf cricketers have been continuously ignored in India, the deaf cricketer had to quit the sport of cricket and was forced to sell moong kachori at a roadside stall as he started a Kachori Stall with the help of his wife Roza Sheikh in Vadodara, Gujarat on the Old Padra Road with the intention of relieving from the financial crisis which affected his family members as he is the only income earner in the family.

In 2017, he built a Cricket Academy at a school in Vadodara for the deaf cricketers which was also a lifetime dream for him in order to improve the quality of deaf cricket in India.
