= Listed buildings in Hadley and Leegomery =

Hadley and Leegomery is a civil parish in the district of Telford and Wrekin, Shropshire, England. It contains ten listed buildings that are recorded in the National Heritage List for England. Of these, one is at Grade II*, the middle of the three grades, and the others are at Grade II, the lowest grade. Hadley and Leegomery are areas in the town of Telford. The most important building in the parish was Apley Castle, but this has been largely demolished and redeveloped, and what remains of it is listed at Grade II*. Other structures associated with the building are listed, and the other listed buildings in the parish include two former mills, an 18th-century house, two locks and a bridge associated with the now disused Shrewsbury Canal, a public house, and a war memorial.

== Key ==
Grade	Criteria
II*	Particularly important buildings of more than special interest
II	Buildings of national importance and special interest

== Buildings ==
Name and location	Photograph	Date	Notes	Grade
Stables at Apley Castle; 52.71527°N 2.51227°W		Early to mid 14th century	The present building has been developed from the remains of Apley Castle, a manor house, including the stables and a chapel. They are in sandstone, and form four ranges around a central courtyard. The doorways and windows are of varying types.	II*
Former garden walls, barn and outbuildings northwest of Stables at Apley Castle; 52.71611°N 2.51310°W	—	16th century	The earliest part of the wall is in sandstone with triangular coping, and the later part, dating from the 17th century, is in brick with triangular stone coping. The later farm buildings include a seven-barn, a cowhouse, pigsties, and a stable range.	II
Dovecote; 52.71601°N 2.51287°W		Early to mid 18th century	The dovecote is outside the garden to the northwest of Apley Castle. It is in brick with a pyramidal tile roof surmounted by a lantern. There is a square plan and two storeys. In both floors are semicircular-arched openings.	II
Hadley Park House; 52.71753°N 2.48075°W	—	Late 18th century	A red brick house with a hipped tile roof, and an approximately square plan. There are three storeys and three bays. The windows are sashes, those in the ground floor on the front with hoods on console brackets. The central porch has a pilastered surround, an open pediment, and a semicircular fanlight.	II
Leegomery Mill; 52.71203°N 2.49458°W	—	Late 18th century	The former water mill is in red and blue brick, and has a dentilled eaves cornice. There are 2½ storeys, a single-storey extension to the east, a doorway on the ground floor, and a doorway in the upper floor approached by a cast iron staircase. The waterwheel has a corrugated iron surround.	II
Hadley Park Windmill; 52.71766°N 2.47935°W		c. 1787	A former combined wind and water mill, it is in red brick, and consists of a circular tapering tower. Its cap has been replaced by an embattled parapet.	II
Turnip Lock, Hadley Park Lock and bridge 52.71645°N 2.48707°W		c. 1796	The two locks on the Shrewsbury Canal, which is now unused, have retained their original mechanism. To the north is a bridge carrying a road. It is in brick and consists of a single round arch that has parapets with stone coping.	II
Former kitchen garden walls west of Stables at Apley Castle; 52.71484°N 2.51332°W		c. 1800	The kitchen garden walls of the former Apley Castle are in brick with stone coping. They contain segmental-arched doorways, and enclose an area of about 90 metres (300 ft) by 40 metres (130 ft). At the southeast, the wall is ramped up to a square pier. Inside the area are a group of garden buildings.	II
Kings Head Public House; 52.70510°N 2.48535°W		Early 19th century	The public house is in brick, and has a tile roof with parapeted gables. There are two storeys, three bays, and an extension to the right. The doorway has fluted pilasters, and an entablature. In the ground floor are two small bow windows, the upper floor contains three casement windows, and in the extension are round-headed and segmental-headed windows and a loft door.	II
Hadley war memorial 52.70458°N 2.48435°W		1953	The war memorial stands in an enclosure by the side of the road. It is in Aberdeen granite, and consists of a cenotaph on a concave chamfered plinth on two steps. It carries an inscription and the names of those lost in both World Wars.	II
