= Nepal national deaf cricket team =

Nepal Deaf Cricket Team
- Nickname: NCAD-Nepal
- Conference: Deaf International Cricket Council
- Association: National Cricket Association of Deaf (Nepal)

Personnel
- Captain: Ribesh Shrestha
- Official website: https://deafnepal.org.np

The Nepal national deaf cricket team represents Nepal in international deaf cricket competitions. The team has been run and governed by the National Cricket Association of Deaf (Nepal) (NCAD), which is responsible for organizing and promoting deaf cricket in the country.

== History ==
The Nepal Deaf Cricket Team was established to provide opportunities for deaf and hard-of-hearing cricketers to compete at an international level. The team has participated in various international tournaments, including the Deaf T20 World Cup and bilateral series against other countries.

== International competitions ==
The Nepal Deaf Cricket Team has competed in several international tournaments, including:

- Deaf T20 World Cup : The team participated in the inaugural Deaf T20 World Cup held in Hyderabad in 2018. They have continued to compete in subsequent editions of the tournament.
- Tri-Nation ODI Series: In 2023, Nepal participated in a Tri-Nation ODI series against India and Bangladesh, hosted by India.

== Achievements ==
The Nepal national deaf Cricket team has achieved notable success in international competitions, including:

- 2018 Deaf T20 World Cup: Nepal reached the semi-finals of the tournament.
- Tri-Nation ODI Series: The team has competed against strong opponents like India and Bangladesh, showcasing their skills and determination.
