= George Greenway =

English deaf cricketer (born 1993)

George Edward Greenway (born 11 March 1993 in Exmouth, Devon) is an English deaf cricketer who plays for Devon and has captained the England national deaf cricket team in all formats of the game.

== Early life ==
Greenway was born with hearing but contracted meningitis when he was seven months old leaving him profoundly deaf. He has a cochlear implant and also uses British Sign Language to communicate.

Despite being profoundly deaf he attended mainstream school at St Joseph's Roman Catholic School, Exmouth. Aged 16 he went on to complete an apprenticeship in site carpentry. He resides in his home town of Exmouth.

== Playing career ==
A right-arm fast-medium pace, all-rounder, Greenway began playing cricket at Exmouth CC from the age of eight after his parents took him to a Friday night colts training session. He progressed from Colts to the third, second and first teams at Exmouth CC. In 2010, he was selected to play for the Deaf England Lions cricket team on its three-match summer tour, where he took wickets and scored runs in all three matches, including an innings of 50 not out against Alvaston and Boulton Cricket Club.

=== Deaf England ===
After attending a trial weekend for the Deaf England elite squad at Shrewsbury School when he was 16, Greenway, aged 17, played for the England national deaf cricket team in the 2011 Deaf Ashes series in Australia.

Greenway took over as Deaf England captain in 2021 and was a guest of the ECB at Lord’s when he was presented with a tasselled England cap to mark his contribution to disability cricket.

In 2022 he captained the England Deaf cricket team who won the Deaf Ashes series in Brisbane, Australia - Deaf England's first win since 1992.

In 2022 in South Africa, the Deaf England team was successful in an international inclusion tri-series, and Greenway — who took seven wickets in the final match — won the award for bowler of the series.

In 2023 he was about to lead the Deaf England cricket team in the T20 World Cup to be held in Qatar but the Qatar Cricket Association and the Deaf International Cricket Council cancelled the tournament due to regional challenges and uncertainties.

=== Other teams ===
In the summer of 2024, the inaugural match between the ECB Chair's Disability XI and the MCC was held at Lord's, supported by the Lord's Taverners. The mixed disability team (deaf, physical and learning disabilities) featured all three international captains, including Greenway, and beat the MCC on their home ground.

Greenway was called up in 2025 to represent Devon CCC in the National Counties Cricket Championship and on his debut against Cornwall took 4 wickets for 34 runs. He plays his club cricket with his older brother Lawrence, at Exmouth CC who compete in the Devon Cricket Premier League.

He plays for Hawks in the Disability Premier League showcase tournament, and helped his side win the Disability Premier League trophy at Derby in September 2023. He also plays for the Middlesex CCC Mixed Disability cricket team. He currently plays his international cricket for the England Mixed Disability side, being called up to play in a series against India in August 2026. On 15 August 2026, in his fourth appearance, he top-scored in the Mixed Disability side's T20 win over India at Arundel.

=== Honours ===
He won the silver medal in the 2023 Deaf Sports Personality of the Year Award.

== See also ==
- Umesh Valjee
- Mark Woodman
