= Robert Wysome =

English conductor

Robert Wysome (born 1946; died 2019) was the conductor of New College Chorale based in Wellington, Shropshire, Conductor of the Shropshire Youth Orchestra, Musical Director for the Shropshire Music Service and a notable pianist and organist. He was born in South Wales and began his musical career as an organist and accompanist. He read music at Cardiff University where he studied composition with Alun Hoddinott CBE and organ with Robert Joyce at Llandaff Cathedral. He was organist at St. John the Baptist Church in Cardiff for several years before moving to Bristol where he performed widely as a conductor and accompanist, working with Bristol Opera Company, University of Bristol Symphony Orchestra and Bristol Old Vic Theatre Company.

He moved to Shropshire in 1975 to become the first Director of Music at New College, Telford. The department gained a wide reputation for its work and was featured regularly on local and national radio and television, including a series of joint projects with Welsh National Opera. After retiring from full-time teaching in 2001, Wysome worked as a freelance musician, particularly in the fields of conducting, examining and accompanying.

In the 1980s, Wysome began working with the Shropshire Music Service and conducted the Shropshire Youth Orchestra on many successful foreign tours, visiting Russia, Germany, France, the Netherlands, Norway, Italy, Hungary and the Czech Republic as well as regular visits to the Festival of Youth Orchestras as part of the Edinburgh Festival. He had a huge impact on the musical lives of many young people over his time with the orchestra and his standing down from conducting in 2012 was a great loss to young musicians in Shropshire. His final tour with the orchestra to Salzburg, Austria in 2011 was widely considered a huge success.

His work with various orchestras enabled Wysome to direct concertos with many leading soloists, including Jack Brymer, Emma Johnson, Peter Donohoe, Erich Gruenberg, Alan Schiller, Robert Cohen, Michele Petri and Leeds Piano Competition winner Ricardo Castro. He has also conducted concerts of a lighter nature - working with Sir Patrick Moore, Robert Hardy CBE, Brian Kay, Jon Pertwee and Timothy West CBE - and open-air "fireworks" concerts at venues such as Castle Howard in Yorkshire, Killerton Park in Exeter and both Attingham Park and Aqualate Park in Newport, Shropshire.

Wysome served as Chairman of the Telford Arts Festival, Director of the Shropshire Schools Opera Project and worked on the BBC 'Music in Action' television series.
