= Hadley and Leegomery =

Civil parish in Shropshire, England

Coordinates: 52.7117°N 2.4910°W

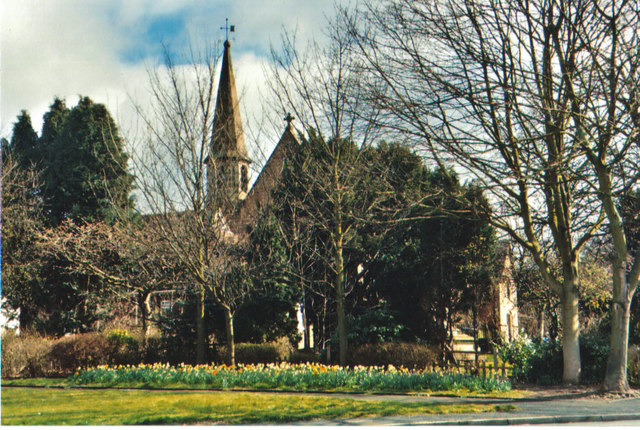
- The Holy Trinity Church, Hadley

- Location within Shropshire
- Area: 9.366 km^{2} (3.616 sq mi)
- Population: 16,188 (2021 census)
  - Density: 1,728/km^{2} (4,480/sq mi)
- Civil parish: Hadley and Leegomery
- Unitary authority: Telford and Wrekin
- Ceremonial county: Shropshire
- Region: West Midlands
- Country: England
- Sovereign state: United Kingdom
- Police: West Mercia
- Fire: Shropshire
- Ambulance: West Midlands
- Website: http://www.hadleyleegomery-pc.gov.uk

Hadley and Leegomery, formerly just Hadley is a civil parish in Telford and Wrekin unitary authority area, in the ceremonial county of Shropshire, England. It includes the villages of Hadley, Leegomery and Horton, all of which were mentioned in the Domesday Book, although the parish is now part of modern Telford. In 2021 the parish had a population of 16,188. The parish was renamed from "Hadley" to "Hadley and Leegomery" on 11 February 2003.

Apley Castle, in the parish, was built in the 13th century and remodelled in the late 15th or early 16th century. It was then incorporated into the stable block of an 18th -century house, which has since been demolished. The remaining stable block is Grade II* listed. As of 2024 there are 9 other listed buildings in the parish, all at grade II.

The parish has a parish council, the lowest level of local government. There are 16 councillors representing five wards:

- Apley Castle ward (4 councillors)
- Hadley Castle ward (7 councillors)
- Hadley Manor ward (3 councillors)
- Horton ward (1 councillor)
- Trench Lock ward (1 councillor)

== See also ==
- Listed buildings in Hadley and Leegomery
