= Learning Community Trust =

Multi-academy trust in Shropshire, England

The Learning Community Trust is a multi-academy trust in England which operates in Shropshire and is based in Telford.

It was founded in 2017 by Dr Gill Eatough, headteacher of Hadley Learning Community. Eatough served as the CEO for five years before retiring in 2022.

In 2022, Jane Hughes replaced Eatough as the CEO and stayed for three years. In 2025, Paul Roberts replaced Hughes as the CEO, having formerly been the deputy CEO.

The trust's current leadership team is as follows:

- Paul Roberts – chief executive officer
- Paul Jones – chief operating officer
- Maddie Griffin – director of education: primary schools
- Alison Ashley – director of education: specialist and SEND schools
- Richard Gummery – interim director of education: secondary schools
- James Youngman – director of finance
- Val Turner – director of people

== Schools ==
Schools in the trust include:

=== Primary schools ===
- Allscott Meads Primary School
- Crudgington Primary School
- Hadley Learning Community Primary
- Lantern Primary Academy
- Wrekin View Primary Academy

=== Secondary schools ===
- Burton Borough School
- Charlton School
- Ercall Wood Academy
- Hadley Learning Community Secondary
- New Road Academy

=== Special schools ===
- Kickstart Academy
- Queensway School
- Severndale Special School
