= M.A.S. Records =

Mighty Atom Smasher Records
- Founded: 9 November 2001
- Founder: Robert Plant
- Status: current
- Genre: All genres
- Country of origin: England
- Location: Kidderminster, Worcestershire
- Official website: http://www.mightyatomsmasher.com/

M.A.S. Records is a British independent record label and music development program, founded in 2001 by Kevyn Gammond with musicians Robert Plant and Karl Hyde as its patrons.

== History ==
The label was founded in 2001 by Kevyn Gammond who was a founder member of the Band of Joy alongside Robert Plant and Jimmy Page who went on to form Led Zeppelin. Gammond worked with Jimmy Cliff and Jess Roden (among others) which led him to tour with The Rolling Stones, Jimi Hendrix and The Who. His knowledge of the music industry then led him to write and develop a pioneering music development course, a move that led to the creation of M.A.S. Records. In 2004, M.A.S. Records teamed up with BBC Hereford & Worcester and the Clifford T Ward foundation to launch the Clifford T Ward songwriting competition, which became a success, gaining the label international recognition when Arts And Entertainment US filmed a documentary following the label's success, and Robert Plant's involvement as patron - the documentary has since been broadcast worldwide.

In 2006, M.A.S. Records was presented with the European Social Fund Award for Learning Achievements, and then in 2008 they won the Rockschool sponsored National Music Award from Access To Music, in recognition of the label's outstanding achievement, standards, and quality of provision. In 2010 M.A.S continued their involvement with Access To Music and Rockschool when they showcased their up-and-coming bands at South by Southwest in Austin, Texas, which is one of the largest festivals in the US.

In 2018 the company entered into a partnership with Telford College to provide work experience to music students.

M.A.S. Records receives funding from the European Social Fund, the Learning and Skills Council, Advantage West Midlands and Rockschool, Ltd.

== List of M.A.S. Records artists ==
=== A ===
- A Certain Silence
- Adore
- Advent Children
- Atlanta House
- alternative milks

=== B ===
- Bad Sugar
- Balm
- Beyond the Bay
- Bite the Kerb
- Blind Rhythm
- Blue Season
- Buried Secrets

=== C ===
- Cafe De Kashmir
- The Cakes
- Casual Agenda
- Caught In The Moment
- Chevron
- Clobber
- Call Me When You're Famous

=== D ===
- Daiquiri Cannons
- Damsons in Distress
- Dance A La Plage
- Danger Of Drowning
- Darkness Is Blinding
- Delirium Theory
- Done By Sunrise
- Dreamers Nightmares

=== E ===
- Effigy For Sleep
- Embers
- Emergency Room
- Empire
- Empty Friend
- Exide
- Exodus Calling
- Endgame

=== F ===
- Feird Wish
- Fizzler
- Flipside Skin
- Forever Dilemma

=== G ===
- Gateway Club
- Gambling with Medusa
- Goodbye Graceful
- Giant and the Georges
- Godeth

=== H ===
- Holocene
- Peanut and the Dudes
- Head To Head

=== I ===
- Influx
- Indifferent
- Impartial Addiction
- Intrepid
- Imogen’s Kiss

=== J ===
- Jester
- Jazz Thrash Assassin

=== K ===
- Kairos
- Keep The Change
- Killtimers
- Kill Joy City
- Karkosa

=== L ===
- Last Masquerade
- Liberation Works
- Lost in Olympus
- Lovats

=== M ===
- Man Half Machine
- Morning Glory
- Mordrake
- Moth Honey
- Myriad

=== N ===
- Not By Decision
- Native Sons
- News at Ten

=== O ===
- Only Route Out
- Open Arms
- Override

=== P ===
- Page 44
- The Press
- Pretentious Class
- Pretty Selective
- Pixel Fix

=== R ===
- The Regulars
- Relocate My Satellites
- Ronin
- Rising Struggle

=== S ===
- Seeley's Jazz'Ole
- ShinKicker
- Shoot The Runner
- Spilt Milk Society
- Stormridden
- Switchplay
- Synthetic Recipe

=== T ===
- Tree
- The Cosmics
- The Assist
- The Breakout Scene
- The Common
- The Culture
- The Daniels
- The Grade
- The Indigo Project
- The Limelight
- The Nortons
- The SJS Band
- Teddy Punch
- That Cavalier Attitude
- Their Souls for Gold
- This Memory
- Three Piece Lawsuit
- Tooth & Dagger
- Treason Kings
- Trying The Tides
- The Outlyers
- The Press
- The Warped
- Trivax

=== V ===
- Vague Process

=== W ===
- We Are Saviours
- Wychbury Cartel
- Winstons Big Brother

=== X ===
- Xadium

== See also ==
- List of record labels
