= Telford Priory School =

Coordinates: 52.7029°N 2.4518°W

New Road Academy (previously Telford Priory School)

Location
- New Road; Wrockwardine Wood; Telford, Shropshire, TF2 7AB; England

Information
- Type: Academy
- Motto: Committed to Excellence in Education
- Established: 2015
- Founder: Community Academies Trust
- Department for Education URN: 150811 Tables
- Ofsted: Reports
- Trust: Learning Community Trust
- Principal: Andrea Bell
- Gender: Coeducational
- Age: 11 to 16
- Houses: Queen Elizabeth, Rashford, Malala and Attenborough
- Colours: Red, Yellow, Green and Purple
- Website: newroad.lct.education

New Road Academy (previously The Telford Priory School) is a coeducational secondary school located in the Wrockwardine Wood area of Telford in Shropshire, England.

The school opened in September 2015 in a new campus, following the merger of Wrockwardine Wood Arts Academy (formerly Wrockwardine Wood Secondary School) and Sutherland Co-operative Academy. The school is sponsored by the Community Academies Trust.

The school facilities include full size 3G Astro with the leisure centre next door holding a 400m athletics track, sports hall, two netball courts, fitness suite, dance studio and is located next to an indoor tennis centre and four outdoor courts.

In 2024, it underwent a transformation with a new name which is "New Road Academy".

It also appointed a new Principal Andrea Bell and became part of the Learning Community Trust as well as other changes.

In 2025, the school experienced its best GCSE results in its history and the Principal acknowledged the school's transformation in a year.

== Inspection judgements ==
The school was inspected by Ofsted in 2018, with a judgement of Requires Improvement. As of 2022, the school's most recent inspection was in 2022, also with a judgement of Requires Improvement.
