= Philip Oliver (cricketer) =

English cricketer (born 1956)

Personal information
- Full name: Philip Robert Oliver
- Born: 9 May 1956 (age 70); West Bromwich, Staffordshire, England
- Batting: Right-handed
- Bowling: Right-arm off break

Domestic team information
- Years: Team
- 1988–1989: Minor Counties
- 1987–1993: Staffordshire
- 1985: Shropshire
- 1975–1982: Warwickshire
- 1972–1974: Shropshire

Career statistics
Competition	First-class	List A
Matches	89	122
Runs scored	2,679	1,870
Batting average	24.80	22.26
100s/50s	2/9	–/4
Top score	171*	78*
Balls bowled	3,684	2,565
Wickets	27	51
Bowling average	78.33	39.42
5 wickets in innings	–	–
10 wickets in match	–	–
Best bowling	2/28	3/36
Catches/stumpings	45/–	28/–
- Source: Cricinfo, 8 July 2011

Philip Robert Oliver (born 9 May 1956) is a former English cricketer. Oliver was a right-handed batsman who bowled right-arm off break. He was born in West Bromwich, Staffordshire and educated at Burton Borough School in Newport, Shropshire.

== Warwickshire ==
Oliver made his debut in county cricket for Shropshire in the 1972 Minor Counties Championship against Durham, with Oliver representing the county from 1972 to 1974. It was for Shropshire that he made his List A debut for against Essex in the 1974 Gillette Cup, a match in which he scored 2 runs before being dismissed by Ray East. He later made his first-class debut for Warwickshire against Glamorgan in the 1975 County Championship. A regular over the coming seasons, Oliver played 89 first-class matches for Warwickshire from 1975 to 1982, with his final first-class appearance coming against Yorkshire in the 1982 County Championship. A batting all-rounder, Oliver scored 2,679 runs in 89 first-class appearances, at an average of 24.80. In the process he made 9 fifties and 2 centuries. His highest score, an unbeaten 171, came against Northamptonshire in the 1981 County Championship. It was the 1981 season which was his most successful, with him scoring 554 runs at an average of 50.36. In no other season did he average above 30, although the 1980 season was the season in which he scored his most runs in a season, 772 at an average of 22.57. Used as an occasional bowler, Oliver took 27 wickets at a bowling average of 78.33, with best figures of 2/38.

He made his first List A appearance for Warwickshire in his debut season, debuting in that format for the county against Glamorgan in the 1975 John Player League. He made 112 List A appearances for Warwickshire from 1975 to 1982, the last of which came against Surrey in the final of the 1982 NatWest Trophy at Lord's. He scored 1,698 runs in his 112 appearances, which came at an average of 22.94, with Oliver scoring 4 fifties. His highest score of 78 not out came against Hampshire in the 1978 John Player League. Used more often with the ball in List A cricket when compared to first-class cricket, Oliver took 51 wickets at an average of 39.43, with best figures of 3/36. The 1979 season was his most successful in terms of runs, 459, and wickets, 16. In no other season did he take more wickets or score more runs in List A cricket. He left Warwickshire at the end of the 1983 season.

== Later career ==
After leaving Warwickshire, he played a single Minor Counties Championship match for Shropshire in 1985 against Devon, before joining Staffordshire late in the 1987 season, with him making his debut for the county in the Minor Counties Championship against Durham. He played Minor counties cricket for Staffordshire from 1987 to 1993, making 28 Minor Counties Championship appearances 4 MCCA Knockout Trophy appearances. Oliver made 136 not out and 124 in a Minor Counties Championship match against Norfolk in 1988. He is one of only 2 other players to have scored a century in both innings of a Minor Counties Championship match for Staffordshire. He made his first List A appearance for Staffordshire against Surrey in the 1988 NatWest Trophy. He made 2 further List A appearances for Staffordshire, against Glamorgan in the 1989 NatWest Trophy and Northamptonshire in the 1990 NatWest Trophy. In his 3 List A matches for the county, he scored 45 runs at an average of 15.00, with a high score of 28. Playing for Staffordshire allowed him to represent the Minor Counties cricket team in List A cricket, with Oliver making his debut for the team in the 1988 Benson & Hedges Cup against Northamptonshire. He made 5 further appearances for the team, the last of which came against Derbyshire in the 1989 Benson & Hedges Cup. He scored 125 runs in his 6 matches, which came at an average of 20.83, with a high score of 48.

Following his retirement, Oliver has gone on to write about cricket. He currently runs Cicada Sports alongside Herefordshire cricketer Christopher Boroughs and businessman Steve Copson. The store, which specialises in sporting equipment, has sponsored cricketers Peter Trego, Alan Richardson and Stephen Adshead. The company also provides clothing and equipment to Berkshire, Herefordshire and Cambridgeshire. He also coached the Unicorns cricket team, which played in the Clydesdale Bank 40. At club level he has played cricket for Newport, Shropshire and Old Hill at Cradley Heath.
