= Burton Borough School =

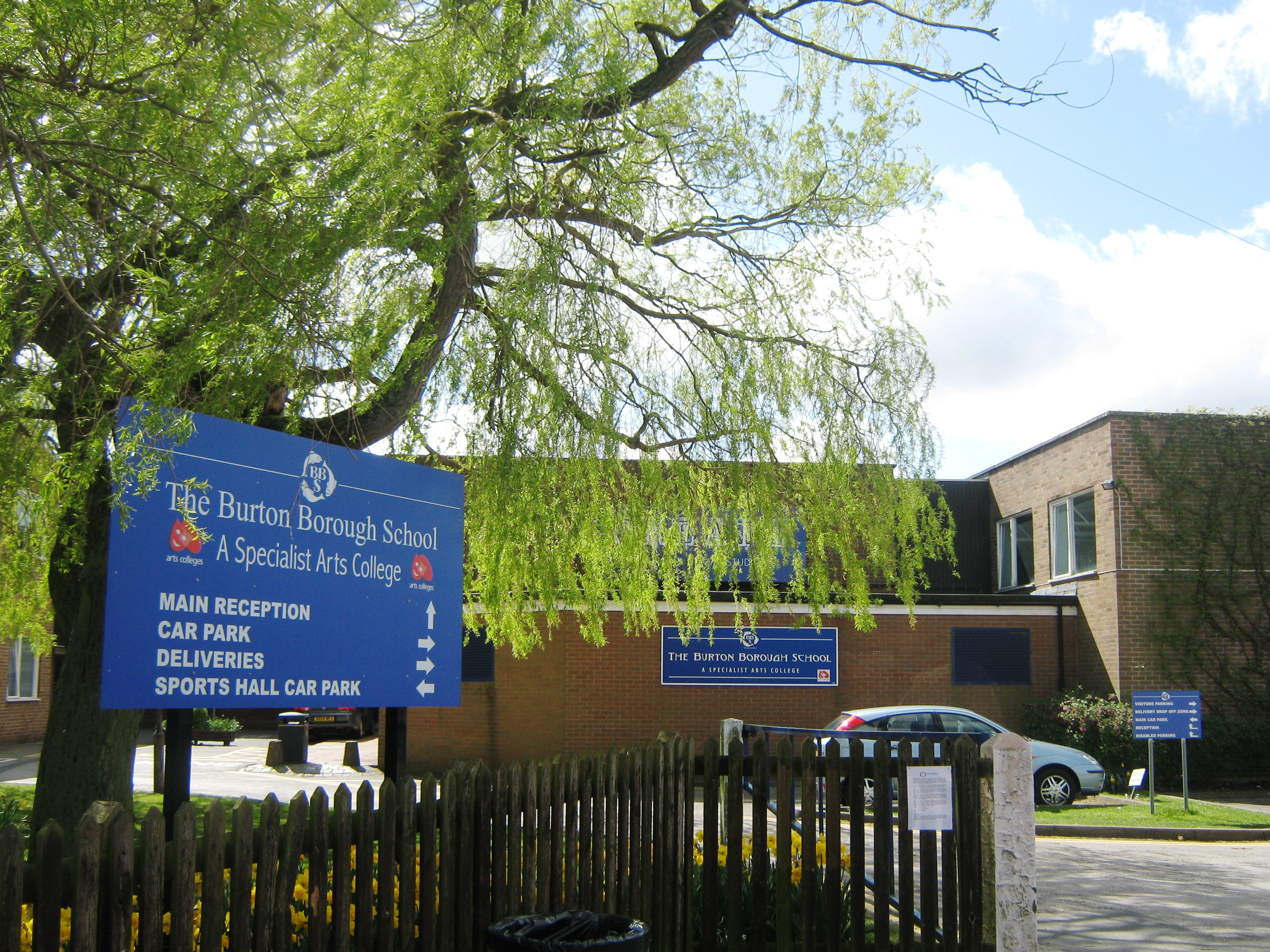

Location
- Audley Avenue; Newport, Shropshire, TF69 7DS; England; 52.7691°N 2.3787°W

Information
- Type: Community school
- Motto: "Be the difference"
- Established: 1957
- Founder: J.S Burton Borough
- Local authority: Telford & Wrekin
- Department for Education URN: 123574 Tables
- Ofsted: Reports
- Principal: Caroline Bedford
- Staff: 180
- Gender: Coeducational
- Age: 11 to 16
- Enrolment: 1,300 (approximately)
- Houses: Aqualate, Chetwynd and Hawkstone (from September 2017)
- Colours: Navy blue, black, grey and white
- Website: www.burtonborough.org.uk

Burton Borough School (often abbreviated as 'BBS') is a coeducational secondary school on the southern edge of Newport, Shropshire, England, in Audley Avenue. The school was opened in 1957. In 2004 it was designated a Specialist Arts College.

The school is named after a local man, J.S. Burton Borough, who was a High Sheriff and deputy lieutenant for Shropshire and was the first governor of the school.

== Development ==
Over the past years, it has been extended and the school enrolment has increased. It now has approximately 1,300 pupils.

The school's top performing subjects are English and Maths which have seen "outstanding" results in recent years and increases in top grades. GCSE English results have performed above national averages and there was a 12 percent increase in strong passes in Maths in 2026 and a doubling in pass rates for English and Maths for vulnerable students.

Under the school's new leadership team, as well as strengthened direction from the Heads of subjects, English has seen strong gains, Maths has also seen rapid imrpovement and overall there has been a significant increase in top GCSE grades.

The first large piece of building work was in 1999 when it was decided to expand the music department, by building a new complex fitted with art gallery, large music rooms, small rooms for 'one to one' development, a theatre and external theatre, plus a recording studio.

With the new pupils, the school received additional funding from the government, which was spent developing the English department by building a block of five new classrooms, and a gym and sports hall next to the Army Cadet Force hut.

The school is still ongoing improvements and has been praised for rapidly increasing pass rates at GCSE, including some subjects performing above national averages.

The school has a band and a big band.

Since April 2024, the school has been part of the Learning Community Trust, which also runs several other secondary schools in Telford such as Charlton School and Hadley Learning Community.

The former deputy headteacher at Hadley Learning Community Caroline Bedford became the Headteacher of Burton Borough in September 2024, following the departure of the outgoing head Krissi Carter.

== New school building ==
The new school building, which lies behind the concurrent building, was completed in 2015. The central space of the building is open plan and connects to the (original) English block, now the Maths block. The new building has a library, unisex toilets and approximately 30 new classrooms: including a design and technology block, a large meeting room, STEM and COMMS classrooms and various ICT suites throughout the building. The new school building cost approximately 8 million pounds. Shortly after, a new main school hall for assemblies and performances was built and cost approximately 1.2 million pounds. BBS realised that the original canteen was not big enough for around 1300 students so they started to expand it in December and it was to be finished on 4 March, 2024.

== Notable former pupils ==
- Ricky Bailey - professional rugby league footballer for St. Helens
- Shaun Bailey- Member of Parliament for West Bromwich West
- David Johnson - Former Jamaica, Ipswich Town and Nottingham Forest footballer
- Philip Oliver - English cricketer for Shropshire, Staffordshire and Warwickshire.
- David Pallett - darts player
- Adam Proudlock - Former Wolves, Ipswich Town and Nottingham Forest footballer
- James Sutton - TV actor best known for starring in Hollyoaks and Emmerdale
- Jason Weaver - English cricketer for Shropshire
