= Leegomery =

Village in Shropshire, England

Coordinates: 52.706781°N 2.499136°W

- Village
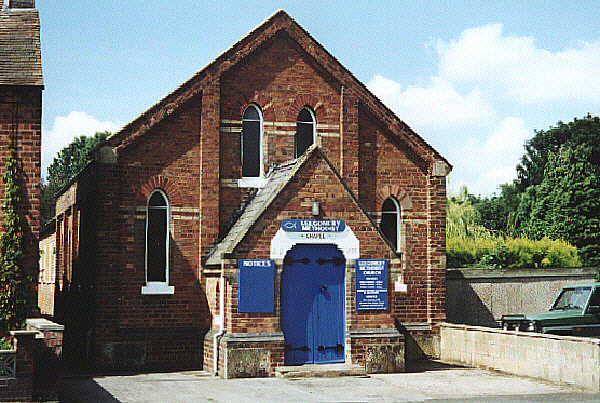
- The Methodist Chapel in Leegomery

- Location within Shropshire
- OS grid reference: SJ660126
- Civil parish: Hadley and Leegomery
- Unitary authority: Telford and Wrekin
- Ceremonial county: Shropshire
- Region: West Midlands
- Country: England
- Sovereign state: United Kingdom
- Post town: TELFORD
- Postcode district: TF1
- Dialling code: 01952
- Police: West Mercia
- Fire: Shropshire
- Ambulance: West Midlands
- UK Parliament: Telford

Leegomery is a village in the Telford and Wrekin borough in Shropshire, England. It forms part of the Hadley and Leegomery civil parish alongside Hadley, Apley Castle, Hadley Castle, Hadley Manor, Hoo and Horton.

== History ==
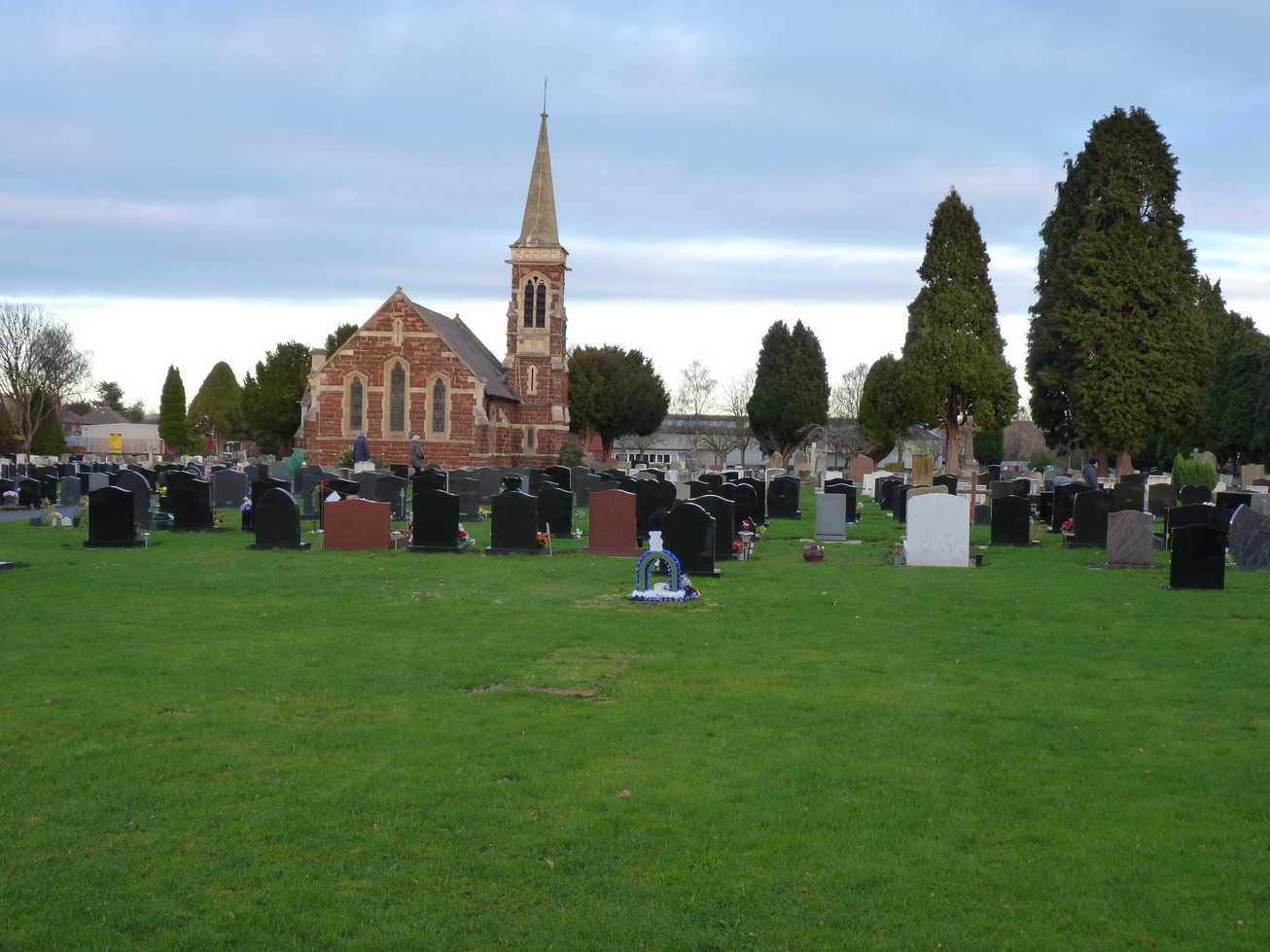
Hadley Park Road Cemetery and Chapel of Rest in Leegomery. No longer in use.

The village was mentioned in the Domesday Book alongside neighbouring villages Hadley and Horton. It has seen expansion since the building of the then-new town of Telford and the wider Telford and Wrekin borough around the outlying towns Wellington, Telford, Dawley and Oakengates. As well as the villages of Hadley, Ketley, Trench and Donnington.

== Amenities ==
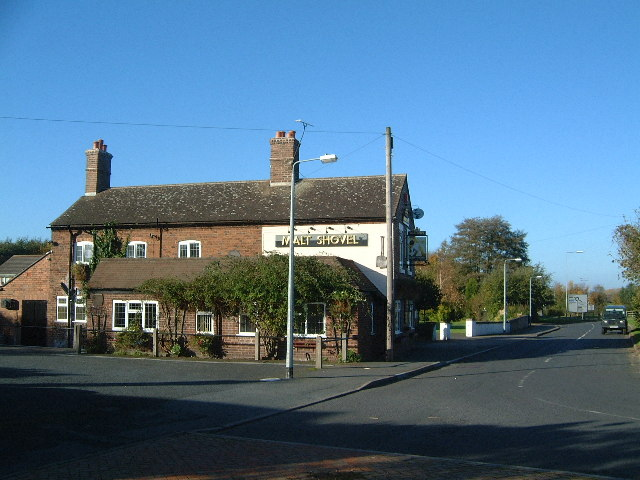
The Malt Shovel public house on Hadley Park Road

Leegomery is primarily residential but is also notable for being the location of Millbrook Primary School. Its closest retail and industrial centres are in nearby Hadley, Wellington and Telford. Leegomery itself is also close to the Princess Royal Hospital in the town of Wellington.

== Leegomery Mill ==
Leegomery Mill is a historic mill, located on Halifax Drive and is a Grade II listed building. It was badly damaged by a fire around the 1970s and 1980s. It has since been restored and is now a private residence.

== Transport ==
The village is close to the Wolverhampton - Shrewsbury line with the nearest railway stations being Wellington, Telford Central and Oakengates. The village is also served by buses connecting it to the towns of Telford, Wellington, Madeley and Newport.
