= Deaf cricket =

Version of cricket for hearing impaired players

Deaf cricket is a version of cricket which is adapted for the deaf. It is governed by the Deaf International Cricket Council (DICC).

== History ==
The first ever interstate deaf cricket match was held in 1895 in Australia between South Australia and Victoria.

The first ever deaf cricket test match was played between India and Australia in India on 1st-3rd November 1978. They continued to play test matches into the 1980s.

The deaf cricket test match was played between Australia and England in 1992. In the inaugural test match Australia defeated England by 10 wickets. Australia then went on to whitewash the England team 5–0 in the test series.

== Deaf International Cricket Council (DICC) ==
The DICC eventually built up to improve and promote the deaf cricket globally. DICC is always working for the betterment of world deaf cricket. It conducted three deaf cricket world cups held in different countries.

== Regional organizations ==
=== England Cricket Association for the Deaf ===
The England Cricket Association for the Deaf has been initiated to improve deaf cricket in England. The England National Deaf cricket team is organized by ECAD.

=== Deaf Cricket – Cricket Victoria ===
The Melbourne Deaf Cricket Club (MDCC) was established in 1880–81.

=== Disability – Surrey Deaf Cricket ===
The Surrey Cricket team also give opportunities to deaf cricketers to play at county level.

=== Indian Deaf Cricket Association ===
The IDCA was established in 2020. The India national deaf cricket team has been run and organised by the Indian Deaf Cricket Association.

=== Pakistan Deaf Cricket Association ===
The PDCA rules the Pakistan national deaf cricket team. PDCA also was interested to host the inaugural Deaf T20 World Cup in 2013. PDCA is the association that conducts the deaf cricket of Pakistan. PDCA works under the shadow of Mr. Zahir Uddin Babar.

=== National Cricket Association of Deaf (Nepal) ===
The NCAD rules the Nepal national cricket team. NCAD sanctions and organizes the cricket related activates in Nepal.

== National teams ==
- Australia national deaf cricket team
- England national deaf cricket team
- India national deaf cricket team
- Nepal national deaf cricket team
- Pakistan national deaf cricket team
- Sri Lanka national deaf cricket team

== See also ==
- Disabled sports in Australia
- 2018 Deaf T20 World Cup
