= Wrockwardine Wood =

Village in Shropshire, England

Coordinates: 52.702°N 2.447°W

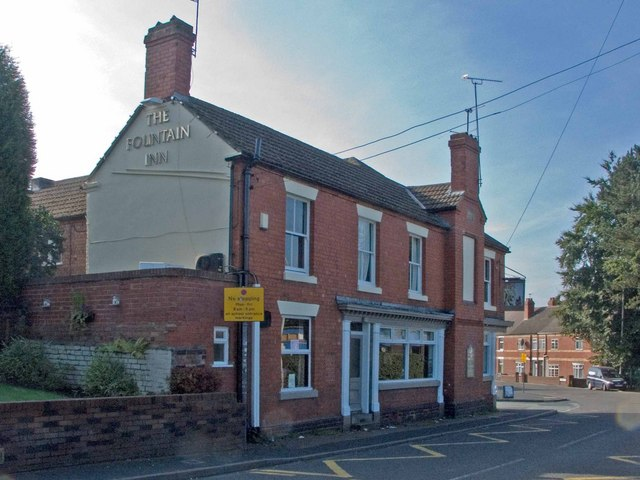
- The Fountain Inn public house, Wrockwardine Wood

- Location within Shropshire
- Population: 5,440 (2011)
- OS grid reference: SJ705115
- Civil parish: Wrockwardine Wood and Trench
- Unitary authority: Telford and Wrekin
- Ceremonial county: Shropshire
- Region: West Midlands
- Country: England
- Sovereign state: United Kingdom
- Post town: Telford
- Postcode district: TF2
- Dialling code: 01952
- Police: West Mercia
- Fire: Shropshire
- Ambulance: West Midlands
- UK Parliament: Telford

Wrockwardine Wood (pronounced "Rock-war-dine") is a village in the Telford and Wrekin borough in Shropshire, England and is bordered by Donnington, St Georges, Trench, The Nabb and Oakengates. In the eighteenth century industrial revolution Wrockwardine Wood was inhabited by coal and iron mine workers and their families. So many people had become Primitive Methodists that the Church of England set up a new parish in 1833 and built the red brick Holy Trinity church, which is grade II listed.

== Local government ==
Wrockwardine Wood forms part of Wrockwardine Wood and Trench civil parish and comes under the governance of Wrockwardine Wood & Trench Parish Council and Telford and Wrekin Council.

Wrockwardine Wood was a detached part of the manor and parish of Wrockwardine until becoming a separate civil parish in 1884. Wrockwardine Wood civil parish was abolished in 1934, when it was absorbed into Oakengates parish.

== The Snake ==
"The Snake" is a small woodland area in Wrockwardine Wood. It was also known as the Cinder Hill for many years. It consists of one main lake and many small swamps along with a large field and many pathways connecting Wrockwardine Wood to Donnington.

The route of the Donnington Canal ran through the southern section of the area, and there was also a Tin Chapel (the "dissident Methodist" Central Hall) that sat on top of one of the many "hills", but was dismantled during the 1980s.

The area is commonly known as "The Snake" because of its winding paths which locals say reminded them of a snake. The surrounding woods and clearings landscaped by Wrekin Council are signposted as "The Central Hall".

The area is used by many people, especially those travelling to and from schools and the supermarket in Donnington Wood on the site of a former pit mound known as the Nobby Bank. The hilly wooded Cockshutt is nearby. Wrekin Council preserved these old industrial places as countryside.

== Education ==
Wrockwardine Wood is home of secondary school Telford Priory School, in New Road, created in 2015 from the amalgamation of Wrockwardine Wood Art Academy (founded originally as Wrockwardine Wood Secondary School) and Sutherland Co-operative Academy.

== Notable people ==
Champion jockey Sir Gordon Richards (1904-1986) grew up in childhood at Wrockwardine Wood where he lived at 1 The Limes, a row of cottages in Plough Road built on land bought by his mother and still standing. He rode helping his parents' pony and trap service to Oakengates station.

Businessman and MI6 agent Greville Wynne (1919-1990) was born here.

== See also ==
- Listed buildings in Wrockwardine Wood and Trench
