= Margaret Baxter =

- Born: 1636; Apley Castle, England
- Died: 14 June 1681 (aged 44–45)

Margaret Baxter or Margaret Charlton (1636 – 14 June 1681) was a noble born English religious nonconformist during the English Civil War. She became a follower and later wife and patron of the preacher Richard Baxter.

== Life ==
Baxter was born in Apley Castle and baptised on 18 September 1636. Her parents were Mary and Francis Charlton. The castle was their family seat. Her father died in 1642 and her mother quickly married Thomas Hamner in order that her children would have a protector. With the outbreak of the English Civil War that year between the supporters of King Charles and Parliament, Hanmer, a royalist, fortified the mansion, which formed a valuable strategic stronghold close to Shrewsbury. Margaret was there when her home, the castle, was sacked by Parliamentary forces during the war. Her step-father, Thomas Hamner, was taken prisoner and the children were taken under the care of Robert Charlton who was Francis's brother. Margaret's mother, Mary Hamner, managed to recover both her children and the castle in order that her son Francis Charlton could become its heir in 1656 or 1657 when he married. At that time her mother and the rest of the family moved to Kidderminster.

Her mother had chosen Kidderminster because that was where the non-conformist Richard Baxter was preaching. Her mother's enthusiasm for Baxter was not encouraged by her brother, Francis. Margaret moved from Oxford in 1658 to live with her mother. She was already confused about her beliefs and in Kidderminster she became physically ill as well. While she was ill she created a scrapbook containing extracts of Baxter's letters that he sent her. On 10 April 1660 a thanksgiving was organised to celebrate her recovery. Within days Baxter had left for London and Margaret and her mother quickly followed. They organised to live close to each other amid the rumours of a relationship and her mother's death were in 1661. The following year Margaret and Richard Baxter married in September at St Benet Fink church in what is now Threadneedle Street. Over the next few years Baxter would preach at different locations and Margaret's wealth made this possible. Baxter recorded his regard for his wife's steadfastness and his biographer suspects that she may have had a hand in his book A Christian Directory.
