= Wrockwardine Wood and Trench =

Civil parish in Shropshire, England

Coordinates: 52.710°N 2.446°W

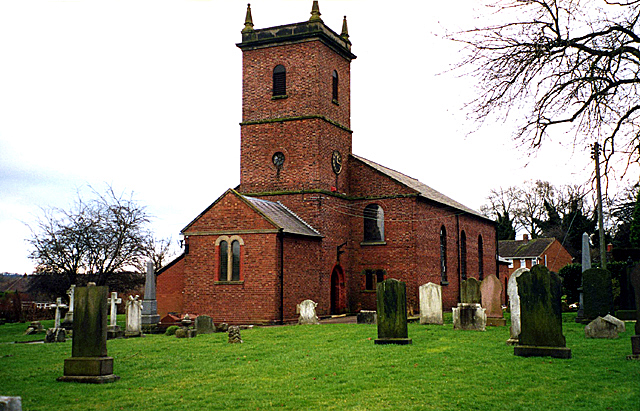
- Holy Trinity Church, Wrockwardine Wood

- Location within Shropshire
- Area: 2.522 km^{2} (0.974 sq mi)
- Population: 5,642 (2021 census)
  - Density: 2,237/km^{2} (5,790/sq mi)
- Civil parish: Wrockwardine Wood and Trench
- Unitary authority: Telford and Wrekin
- Ceremonial county: Shropshire
- Region: West Midlands
- Country: England
- Sovereign state: United Kingdom
- Police: West Mercia
- Fire: Shropshire
- Ambulance: West Midlands
- Website: https://wwtpc.org.uk/

Wrockwardine Wood and Trench, formerly Wrockwardine Wood is a civil parish in the unitary area of Telford and Wrekin, in the ceremonial county of Shropshire, England.

It includes the villages of Trench in the north of the parish and Wrockwardine Wood in the south. It has a parish council made up of eight councillors representing Trench ward, and one each for Kewray Drive Ward, Wrockwardine Wood East, and Wrockwardine Wood West. In 2021 the parish had a population of 5,642. The parish was formed on 1 April 1988 as "Wrockwardine Wood", on 10 May 1989 the parish was renamed to "Wrockwardine Wood and Trench".

The Cockshutt is a local nature reserve in the south of the parish, just north of the A442 road.

== See also ==
- Listed buildings in Wrockwardine Wood and Trench
