= Jerry Dean (footballer) =

English footballer

Personal information
- Full name: John Thomas Dean
- Date of birth: 13 February 1881
- Place of birth: Hadley, England
- Position: Winger

Senior career*
| Years | Team | Apps | (Gls) |
| 1900–1901 | Trench Victoria | | |
| 1901–1902 | Wolverhampton Wanderers | 4 | (0) |
| 1902–1903 | Ironbridge | | |
| 1903–1904 | Wellington Town | | |
| 1904–1912 | Notts County | 254 | (49) |
| Total | | 258 | (49) |
- * Club domestic league appearances and goals

John Thomas Dean (13 February 1881–unknown) was an English footballer who played in the Football League for Notts County and Wolverhampton Wanderers.
