= Ercall Wood Academy =

Location
- Golf Links Lane; Wellington; Shropshire, TF1 2DT; England
- Coordinates: 52.6922°N 2.516°W

Information
- Type: Academy
- Local authority: Telford and Wrekin
- Trust: Learning Community Trust
- Department for Education URN: 145707 Tables
- Ofsted: Reports
- Trust: Learning Community Trust
- Head Teacher: Nicholas Murphy
- Gender: Co-educational
- Age: 11 to 16
- Enrolment: 877 as of August 2020
- Capacity: 900
- Website: http://ercallwood.lct.education/

Ercall Wood Academy is a co-educational secondary school located in Wellington in the English county of Shropshire.

It is an academy converter and is a member of the Learning Community Trust. The school was formerly called Ercall Wood Technology College but changed its name when it joined the trust in June 2018.

The school was rated "Good" by an Ofsted Inspection in 2025.

The headteacher is Mr Nicholas Murphy who has been in the role since September 2023, having previously been Deputy Head at Hadley Learning Community.

The previous head was Mr Richard Gummery, who now works for the Learning Community Trust

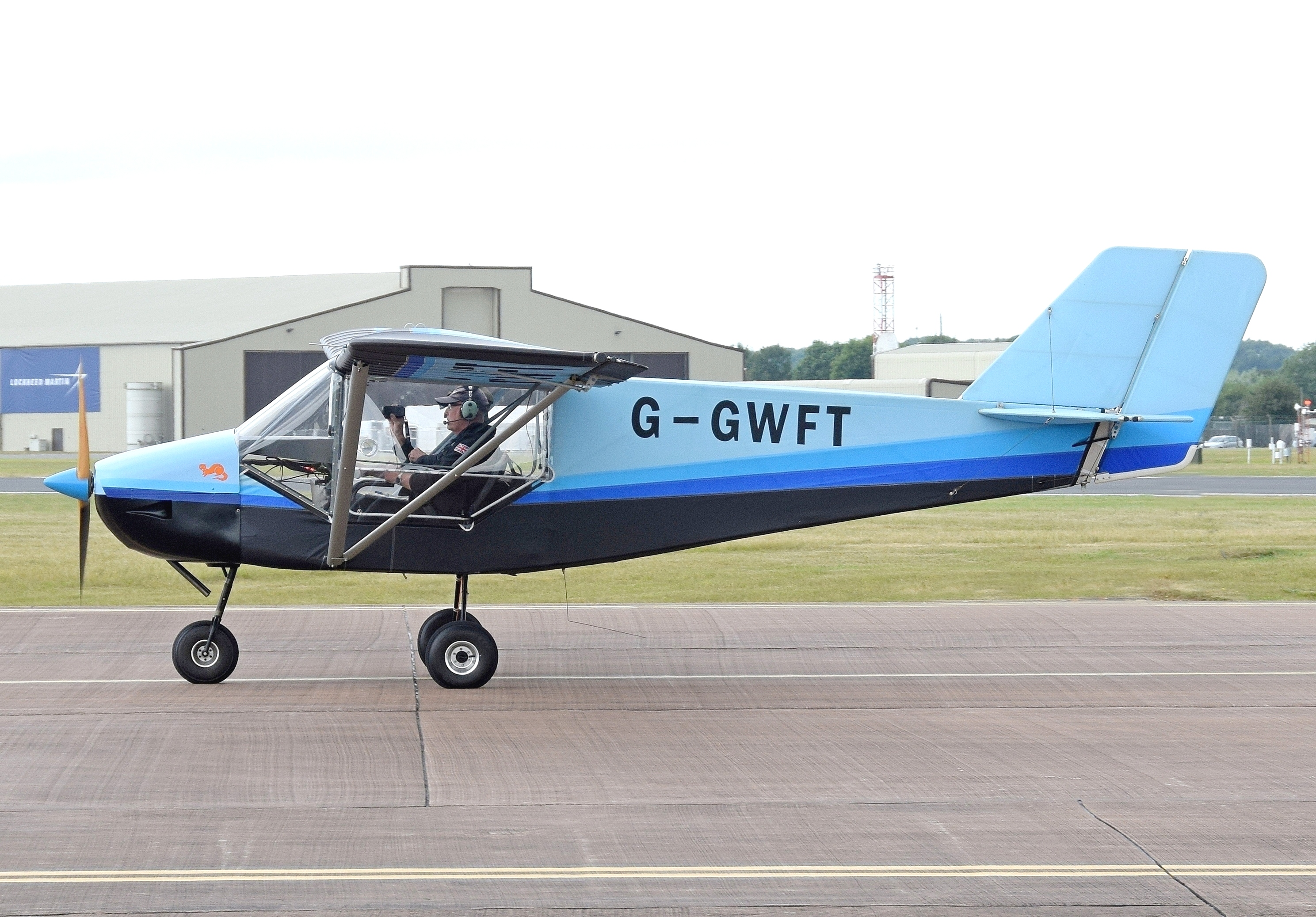
Rans S-6 Coyote II ultralight made by the students of the school arrives at the 2017 RIAT, England
