= Jason Weaver (cricketer) =

English cricketer

Personal information
- Full name: Jason Richard Weaver
- Born: 11 August 1968 (age 58); Wellington, Shropshire, England
- Batting: Right-handed
- Role: Wicket-keeper

Domestic team information
- Years: Team
- 1989–1991: Shropshire

Career statistics
Competition	List A
Matches	2
Runs scored	6
Batting average	3.00
100s/50s	0/0
Top score	6
Catches/stumpings	2/0
- Source: CricInfo, 3 July 2011

Jason Richard Weaver (born 11 August 1968) is a former English cricketer. Weaver was a right-handed batsman who fielded as a wicket-keeper. He was born in Wellington, Shropshire and educated at Burton Borough School in Newport, Shropshire.

== Playing career ==
Weaver made his debut for Shropshire County Cricket Club in the 1989 Minor Counties Championship against Wiltshire. Weaver played Minor counties cricket for Shropshire from 1989 to 1991, making 11 Minor Counties Championship appearances and a single MCCA Knockout Trophy match. He made two List A cricket appearances for Shropshire, making his debut against Derbyshire in the 1990 NatWest Trophy before playing in the 1991 NatWest Trophy against Leicestershire. During that period he played at club level for Newport Cricket Club.

== Coaching career ==
Weaver took a development role in Kent County Cricket Club's Cricket Academy, acting as High Performance Manager for ten years. Following the departure of Simon Willis to become the high performance manager of Sri Lankan cricket in May 2016, Weaver worked with Min Patel in an interim role to manage the academy during the summer of 2016. He was appointed to the role of high performance manager in January 2017, continuing to work alongside Patel. He left the club at the end of the 2019 season after working in the coaching setup at Kent for 13 years.

Weaver is now head coach of the England Deaf Cricket Team.
