= Umesh Valjee =

South African cricketer

Personal information
- Full name: Umesh Damdor Valjee
- Born: 30 September 1969 (age 57); Durban, Natal, South Africa
- Role: Batsman

Umesh Damdor Valjee, MBE (born 30 September 1969 in Durban, Natal) is a South African-born English deaf cricketer. He is a BSL user.

He is a right-handed batsman and very occasional right-arm medium pacer. Valjee came into professional cricket after being signed to British Deaf Sports Council in 1989. He is the longest-serving deaf cricketer of England, and wear the same shirt number (No. 1) as Tom Armitage—the first capped England player.

Valjee is former captain of the England national deaf cricket team, and was awarded with the England Disability Cricketer of the Year in 2011. He was also awarded an MBE in the 2011 New Year's Honours list for services to disabled sport.

He was one of the torchbearers at the 2012 Summer Olympics in London.

Valjee played Jamil in the BBC's series "Switch" (2001-2006), which featured deaf signing actors.
