= Sri Lanka national deaf cricket team =

National sports team

Sri Lanka
- Conference: Deaf International Cricket Council

Personnel
- Captain: Tharaka Sampath Jayasinghe

Sri Lanka national deaf cricket team represents Sri Lanka in international deaf cricket arena. The team consists of players who are having hearing problems (deaf). The team also participated in the 3rd edition of the 2017 Deaf Cricket Asia Cup tournament in India. The team ended up as runners-up to India in the finals, lost the match by a big margin of 156 runs.

In November 2017, the national deaf cricket team played their first ever leather ball ODIs and T20Is against Pakistan, a team which is considered as the most consistent team in deaf cricket history.

On 30 November 2018, Sri Lanka created history after winning the 2018 Deaf T20 World Cup which was also the first ever instance where Sri Lanka won a Deaf T20 World Cup defeating India by 36 runs.

== Current squad ==
- Tharaka Sampath Jayasinghe (Captain)
- Lakshan Fernando (VC)
- Sumudu Lanka
- Tharinda Deepika Wimalasena
- Goyum Shanaka Walgama
- Nalin Sameera
- Asanka Manjula
- Udaya Lakmal
- Priyankara Madushanka
- Kumarasamy Thirukumaran
- Alenross Kalep
- N.P.G.Ushan Lakshitha
- G.A. Nuwan Hasaranga
- A.P. Dinuka Sachin
- Anton Jayasegaram
- Antony Norman

== See also ==
- Sri Lanka national blind cricket team
