= India national deaf cricket team =

- Association: Deaf International Cricket Council

India national deaf cricket team represents India in international deaf cricket arena. The team consists of players who are having hearing problems (deaf).

The team participated in the 3rd edition of the 2017 Deaf Cricket Asia Cup tournament in India. The team ended up as winners to Sri Lanka in the finals, won the match by a big margin of 156 runs.

On 30 November 2018, India ended up as runners-up in the 2018 Deaf T20 World Cup after losing to Sri Lanka by 36 runs.
