= New College, Telford =

Former sixth form college in Telford, Shropshire, England

Coordinates: 52.6989°N 2.5100°W

New College Telford

Location
- King Street, Wellington; Telford, Shropshire, TF1 1NY; England

Information
- Type: Sixth form college
- Motto: Be Ambitious. Think Differently. Stay Focused. Make Your Own Success Story At New College Telford.
- Established: 1976
- Closed: 2018 (merged with TCAT)
- Local authority: Telford & Wrekin
- Ofsted: Reports
- Chair: Gail Bleasby
- Principal: Graham Guest (Interim Principal & CEO)
- Gender: Co-educational
- Age: 16 to 19
- Enrolment: 1450
- Colours: Black & Orange (Student), Lime (Higher education student), Red (Student council), Pink (Temporary), Blue (Staff), Black (Associate), White (Ofsted), Yellow (Visitor) & Green (Governor).
- Website: http://www.nct.ac.uk

New College Telford was a sixth form college situated in Wellington, an area within Telford, Shropshire, England. During December 2017 the merger between Telford College of Arts and Technology, and New College Telford, was officially certified by the Government, meaning the college now trades as Telford College since September 2018.

== Admissions ==
The college catered for 16- to 19-year-olds, but also offered part-time courses to the rest of the community, principally adults. The College offered a range of courses at level two and three with particular specialisms in the sciences, performing arts and music.

The college aimed to create an environment which all students are able to succeed and does this by liaising with partner secondary schools within Telford & Wrekin.

== History ==
=== Grammar school ===
It is the former Wellington Girls' High School, a girls' grammar school, which had opened in 1908. During the Second World War, evacuees attended from Holly Lodge High School in Smethwick.

=== Comprehensive ===
It became a mixed comprehensive in 1974.

=== Sixth form college ===
It became a sixth form college in 1976.

In November 2015 the college alongside Shrewsbury Sixth Form College and Shrewsbury College announced a proposal to merge, in which each college would retain its own principal, "individual culture", and students would continue to apply to each college separately. In February 2016 public consultation began where the proposed name of the combined college was announced to be "Central Shropshire Colleges Group".

In April 2016 following public consultation, the college backed out and proceeded its own, separate, merger with Telford College of Arts and Technology.

In December 2016 the college was rated "Requires Improvement" by Ofsted inspectors, in all areas but "Personal development, behaviour and welfare" which was rated "Good".

In September 2017 the college merged with Telford College of Arts and Technology forming Telford College unveiling the current logo beforehand. The college continued to use two existing campuses until September 2018, with New College keeping its separate identity until then, when all students were moved to the existing Haybridge Road campus with a further £2 million investment in a new facility. Following the movement away from the site in 2018, the modern buildings on the campus were demolished in 2020 with the intention to keep the former girls' school.

The college was under the leadership of interim principal & chief executive Graham Guest, building a link between Telford college of arts & technology with the upcoming merger from August 2017.

== Notable former pupils ==
=== Wellington Girls' High School ===
- Carol Decker (1969–74), singer with T'Pau
- Janet Mayo (broadcaster) (1955–62), newsreader with East Midlands Today in the 1990s
