= 2018 Deaf T20 World Cup =

- Dates: 23 November 2018 – 30 November 2018
- Administrator(s): Deaf International Cricket Council
- Cricket format: 20 Overs
- Tournament format(s): Group and Knockout
- Host(s): India
- Champions: Sri Lanka
- Runners-up: India
- Participants: 8
- Player of the series: (Sri Lanka) Asanka Manjula
- Most runs: (Sri Lanka) Gamindu Malkalm (388)
- Most wickets: (Sri Lanka) Asanka Manjula (15)
- Official website: www.deaficc.com

The 2018 Deaf T20 World Cup was the 3rd edition of the Deaf Cricket World Cup tournament, and was held from 23 to 30 November 2018 for 8 days in India and all of the scheduled matches were held in the city of Gurugram, New Delhi. In the final, Sri Lanka defeated hosts and defending champions India by 36 runs to secure their first ever Deaf T20 World Cup title. Five teams including hosts India, Sri Lanka, South Africa, Australia and Nepal played in the tournament. The tournament was hosted by Deaf Cricket Society in India affiliating with the Deaf International Cricket Council. The tournament began with hosts India played against South Africa on 23 November 2018.

In the final, Sri Lanka batted first and managed to score 145/9 in the 20 overs after being put into bat by India. India were bowled out for 109 runs in 17.5 overs as Sri Lanka claimed victorious for the first time in a major deaf cricket tournament. This was also the third major world cup triumph for Sri Lanka in cricket following the victories at the 1996 Cricket World Cup and 2014 ICC World Twenty20.

Former Australian cricket who is also a global ambassador for Deaf movement Brett Lee invited as the chief guest during the closing ceremony of the event.

== Venues ==
Teri Gram cricket ground in Gurugram was the only venue allocated to host the Deaf T20 World Cup.

== Broadcasting ==
Star Sports, the Premier 24 hour Indian sport network was awarded the rights as the title sponsor for the Deaf T20 World Cup.

== See also ==
- Deaf cricket
- 2018 Blind Cricket World Cup
