= Listed buildings in Wrockwardine Wood and Trench =

Wrockwardine Wood and Trench is a civil parish in the district of Telford and Wrekin, Shropshire, England. The parish contains four listed buildings that are recorded in the National Heritage List for England. All the listed buildings are designated at Grade II, the lowest of the three grades, which is applied to "buildings of national importance and special interest". The parish is a suburb of the town of Telford, and the listed buildings consist of a former steam mill, a church, a rectory, and public house.

== Buildings ==
Name and location	Photograph	Date	Notes
The Mill; 52.71013°N 2.44777°W		1818	The steam mill was built alongside the Donnington Wood Canal, it was expanded in 1891, and has since closed and been converted into apartments. It is built in brick with dentilled eaves, and has a tile roof with stone coped gable ends and shaped kneelers. The original block has two storeys and an attic and six bays. The windows have cast iron frames, small panes, and segmental-headed openings. The extension has four storeys, and there are two two-storey gabled wings at the rear.
Rectory (Holy Trinity); 52.70963°N 2.44512°W	—	Early 19th century	A brick house with a dentilled eaves cornice and a tile roof. There are two storeys and an attic, three bays, and a two-story one-bay wing recessed at the left. In the centre is a doorway with Tuscan half columns and an entablature. The windows are sashes and there are two gabled dormers.
Holy Trinity Church; 52.71060°N 2.44642°W		1833	The church is in red brick with a slate roof, and is in Georgian style. The chancel was added in about 1875, and there were later additions. The church consists of a nave, a chancel with a polygonal apse, and a west tower. The tower has three stages, a south doorway, a clock face on the south side and round windows on the other sides, round-headed bell openings, cornices and a parapet with corner obelisk finials. The windows in the body of the church have round heads, and inside there is a west gallery on cast iron columns.
Bull's Head Public House; 52.70849°N 2.44422°W		Late 19th to early 20th century	The public house has a front of glazed brick and a tile roof. There are two storeys and two bays. In the ground floor is a public house front with pilasters, an entablature, and engraved glass windows, and the upper floor contains bay windows with gables and terracotta finials.
