= Disabled sports in Australia =

Disability sport in Australia encompasses individuals with different disabilities, of all ages and skill levels from recreational to professional, participating in sport in Australia. The apex of disability sport in Australia is the Paralympics. Australia's participation at the Paralympics began with the inaugural 1960 Summer Paralympics and 1976 Winter Paralympics. Australia hosted the 2000 Summer Paralympics in Sydney.

Federal government involvement in disability sport has focused on 'mainstreaming' disability sport, which has the objective of seeing disability sport together with sport generally, rather than a distinct area. The most popular disability sport in Australia is swimming. Sport Australia's inclusive sport framework focuses on fostering a positive sporting environment for everyone, regardless of age, ability, cultural background, physical or intellectual disabilities. Australian participation in disability sports is lower than in able bodied sports. According to the Australian Bureau of Statistics, approximately 59% of individuals with a reported disability between 5 and 14 years old participated in physical activity, compared to 20% of 15–64-year-olds and 12% of individuals aged older than 65.

== Federal Government involvement ==
Federal government involvement in disability sport formally began in 1981 with the establishment of the National Committee for Sport and Recreation for the Disabled (NCSRD), which was designed to assess priority areas for the development of disability sport and make recommendations to the minister for change. Initially, the programme received A$200,000 out of the A$2.9million budget for sport development. After the Hawke Labor government won the 1983 election, improving access to sport for people with disabilities became a more mainstream policy priority as part of their social democratic and federalist agenda. By the end of the 1980s, sport governance in Australia had completed an organisational overhaul and by the end of the decade the Australia Sports Council (ASC) boosted spending on Disabled Sports Program to A$800,000. However, this was still a small percentage of the A$21.5 million allocated to the ASC for 'Sport Development'.

In 1990–91, ASC renamed the Disabled Sports Program to 'Aussie Able', and the ASC also claimed that any ASC program available to non-disabled athletes would also be made available to those with disabilities. This assertion was backed by the necessary funding, the ASC made a record A$1.6 million available to Aussie Able. In 1992 the Commonwealth Disability Discrimination Act came into force, which made it illegal to discriminate against another person based on their disability. Therefore, from this point on, the ASC has a legislative obligation to not discriminate when planning funding. This led to a more equitable spread of funding for Paralympic sport.

From 2000, 'mainstreaming' policies has remained the focus of the government. The goal of mainstreaming is to ensure that people with disabilities can compete and participate in regular sporting structures, rather than keeping disability sport in a separate sphere. The BASA policy emerged after the 2000 Paralympic Games in Sydney and the policy reinforced the mainstreaming goals. ProjectCONNECT was one manifestation of this policy, with the goal of working with Athletics, Swimming, Basketball, Yachting, Tennis and Ten Pin bowling national sporting organisations to encourage the organisations to take a bigger lead in promoting disability inclusion. These mainstreaming efforts continued into the 2010s and there was a renewed focus of disability sport at the recreational level, as well as bolstering participation among children.

In 2022, there are several grants and funding opportunities for athletes with disabilities to pursue sport. The Local Para Champions grant provides funds for coaches, competitors and officials aged 12–24, who are participating in competition with a disability. The Compensation Grant fund helps Paralympic athletes whose Disability Support Pension payments are affected by international travel. Lastly, the dAIS Athlete Grant provides athletes with disabilities direct financial support to allow them to focus on competition to reach strategy targets in Paralympic sports.

== Para Swimming in Australia ==
In 1991 Australian Swimming received an integration grant from the ASC to kick-start the development of inclusionary practices. The specific implementation policy was announced in the 1990-91 annual report. Integration programme manager Anne Green stated that the goals of the policy were to ensure that people with disabilities had access to swimming in a recreational and competitive environment, foster positive community attitudes towards people with disability in swimming by encouraging the community to get involved in swimming programmes for people with disabilities. These goals manifested in Swimming Australia policy by incorporating more events for athletes with disabilities into the Swimming Australia calendar and improve disability coaching education. In the build-up to the 2000 Paralympic Games in Sydney, 'special events' featuring disabled athletes started to become part of mainstream swimming competitions.

Following the success of the 2000 Paralympic Games, Swimming Australia took a more active role in promoting disability sport. Swimming Australia was involved in the Paralympic preparation programme (PPP). The goal of the PPP was to provide elite level athletes with disabilities with the same opportunities as non-disabled athletes. In the context of swimming, this meant ensuring that disable athletes had the same access to training camps, international tours and competitions. Swimming Australia was one of the pioneering national sporting organisations involved in the project. In addition, Swimming Australia was involved in ProjectCONNECT, as a result, a variety of policies were implemented to bring organisational practices in line with broader government directions that emphasised social inclusion and corporate responsibility for inclusion. Swimming Australia were placed in the final stage of the ProjectCONNECT process, and was awarded funding to employ a full-time inclusion coordinator to "coordinate a national inclusion strategy, liaise with [Australian Swimming] stakeholders and relevant external organisations, and provide leadership and advice on all aspects of swimmer with disability inclusion". Michael Woods was then appointed as inclusion coordinator and shed some light on what inclusion meant in the context of swimming, "inclusion is more than simply taking on a swimmer with disability into a squad. Inclusion in swimming is about providing a range of reasonable options for everyone to participate".

== Notable athletes ==
=== Dylan Alcott ===
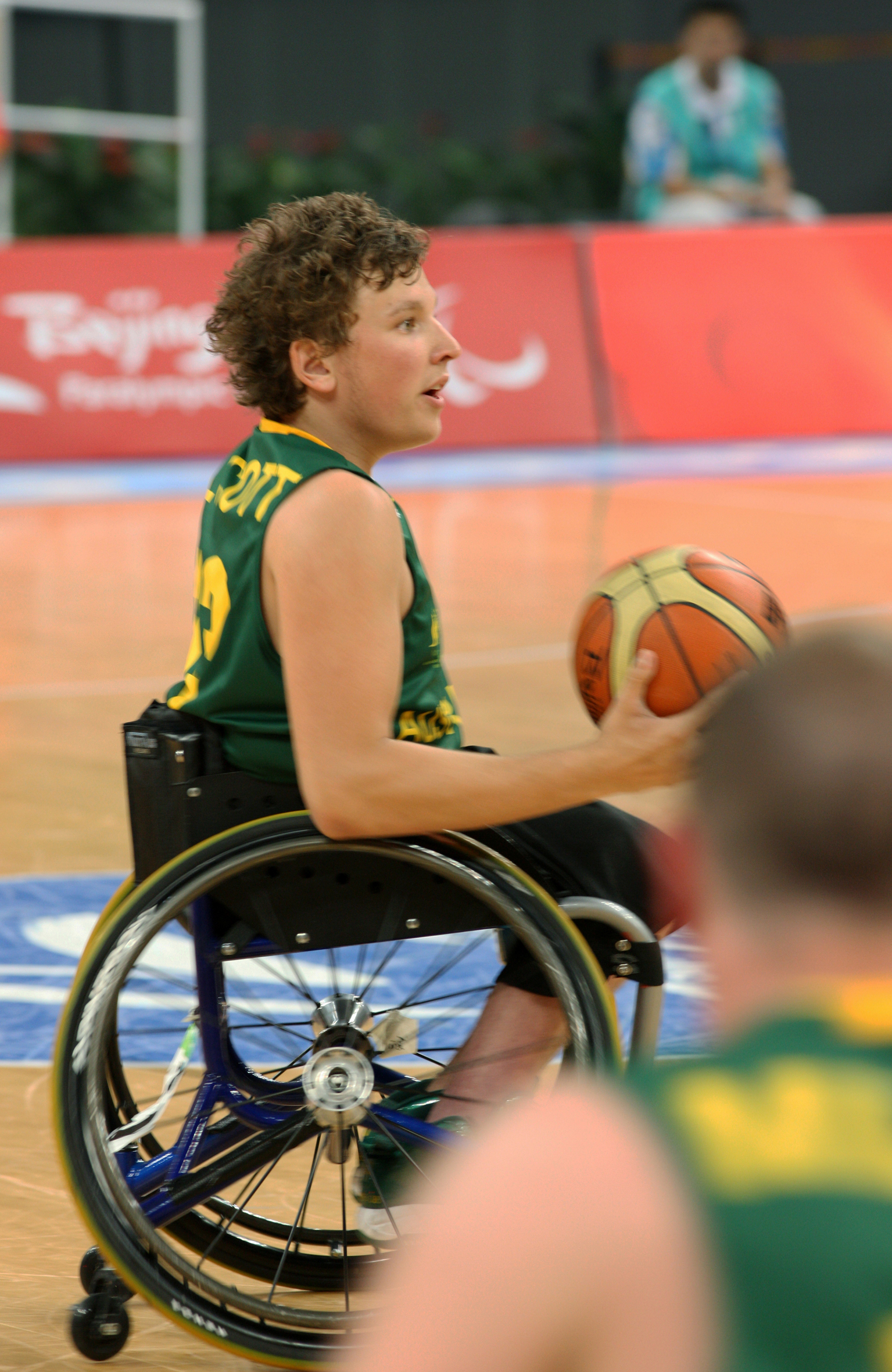
Dylan Alcott competing in wheelchair basketball at the 2008 Paralympic Games in Beijing

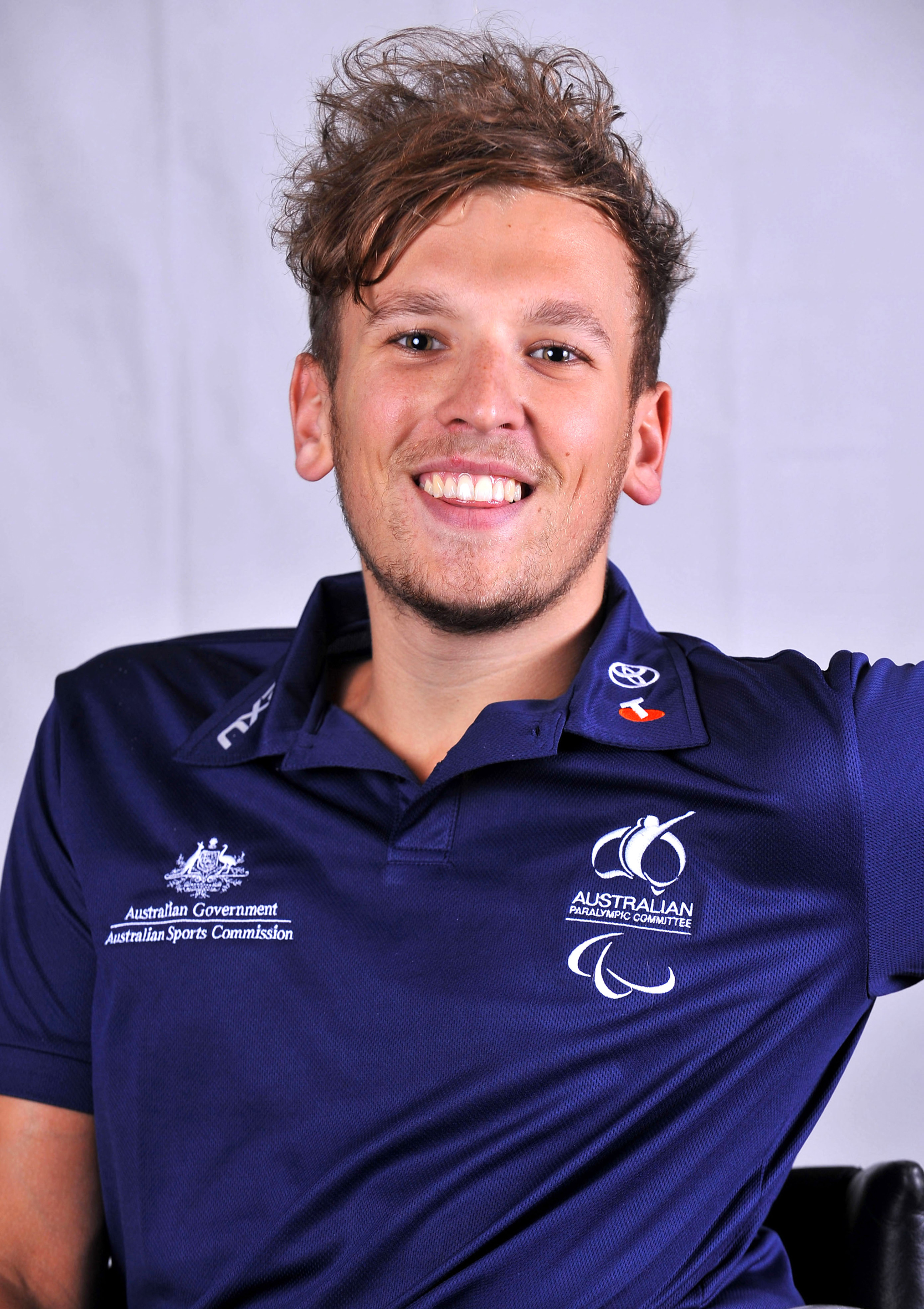
Dylan Alcott in 2011

Dylan Alcott is a former wheelchair tennis and wheelchair basketball player. Alcott was born with a tumor wrapped around his spinal cord. Despite the tumour being successfully removed, it resulted in Alcott being paraplegic.

Alcott made his professional debut for the Australia men's national wheelchair basketball team in 2006 at the Wheelchair Basketball World Championship. Alcott represented Australia at the 2008 Summer Paralympics in Beijing and the 2012 Summer Paralympics in London, where the team won gold and silver respectively.

Alcott returned to tennis in a professional capacity in 2014. Alcott plays in the Quad category of wheelchair tennis, which "is for athletes with additional restrictions in the playing arm, which limits the ability to handle the racquet and manoeuvre the wheelchair". Alcott won his first Grand Slam singles title at the 2015 Australian Open and first Grand Slam doubles title at the 2018 Australian Open. Alcott would go on to win 15 Grand Slam singles and 8 Grand Slam doubles titles over the course of his career. In 2019 Alcott became only the third male player in all of tennis to win all four Grand Slam titles and a gold medal in one calendar year, colloquially known as the 'Golden Slam'. Alcott represented Australia at the 2016 Summer Paralympics, winning gold in singles and doubles; and the 2020 Summer Paralympics, winning gold in singles. Alcott retired from professional sports following the 2022 Australian Open.

On 26 January 2022, Alcott was named Australian of the Year "for distinguished service to paralympic sport, particularly to tennis, and as a role model for people with disability, and to the community through a range of organisations".

Dylan Alcott competing at the 2022 Australian Open in Melbourne. This is match point in his semi-final match against Andy Lapthorne. Alcott won the match 6-3 6–0.

=== Louise Sauvage ===
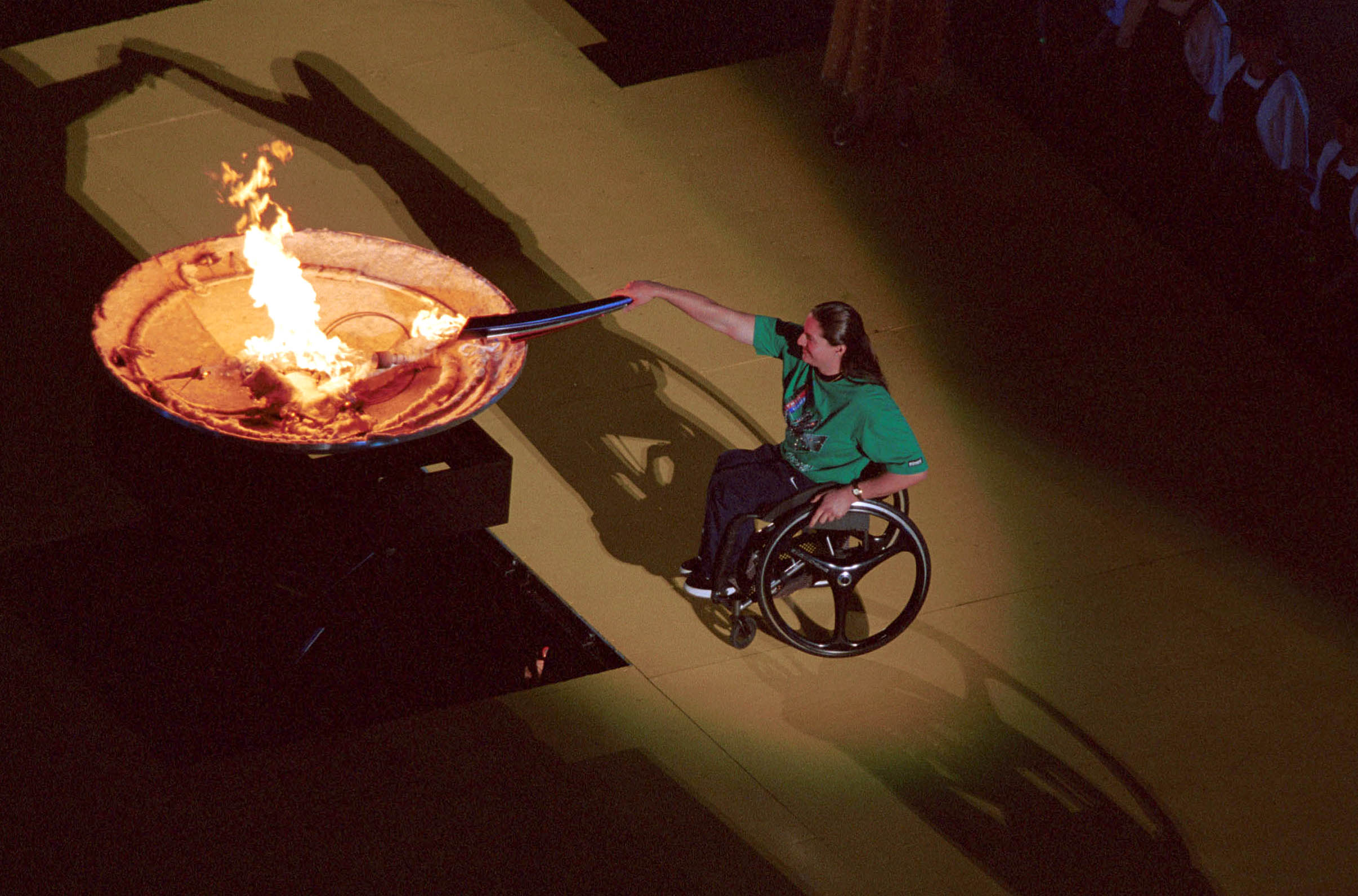
Louise Sauvage lighting the cauldron with the Paralympic Flame at the finish of the torch relay at the 2000 Sydney Paralympic Games Opening Ceremony

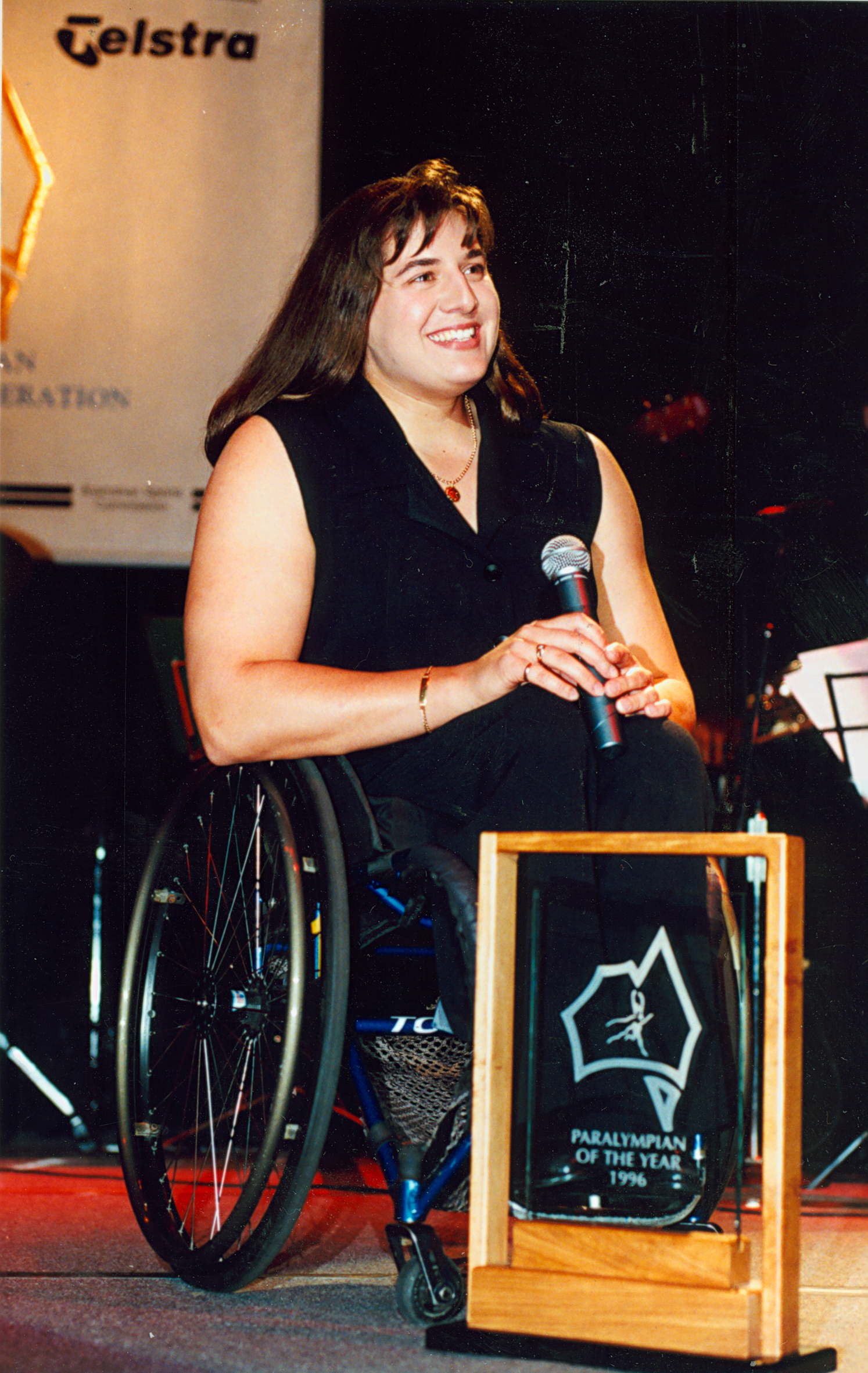
Louise Sauvage accepting the 1996 Australian Paralympian of the Year award

Alix Louise Sauvage is a former paralympic wheelchair racer. Sauvage first represented Australia in the 1992 Paralympic Games in Barcelona and has won nine gold and four silver medals over four paralympic events. In the World Para Athletics Championships, Sauvage won eleven gold and two silver medals. In the IAAF World Athletic Championships, she won gold in the 1993, 1995, 1997 and 2001 editions. Sauvage has also won four Boston Marathon gold medals in 1997, 1998, 1999 and 2001, one gold and one silver medal the Los Angeles Marathon in 1997 and 1995 respectively and one gold medal in the 1997 Berlin Marathon.

In 1993, Sauvage was awarded the Medal of the Order of Australia for her contribution to sport. Sauvage was named the Australian Paralympian of the Year in 1994, 1996, 1997 and 1998. In 2000, Sauvage won the "Female Athlete of the Year" award in the Sport Australia Awards and the World Sportsperson of the Year with a Disability at the Laureus Sports Awards. In 2007, she was inducted into the Sport Australia Hall of Fame, and in 2019 was made a Legend in the Sport Australia Hall of Fame, becoming the first Paralympic athlete to be awarded Legend status.

After retiring from professional sport, Sauvage started coaching in 2004. Angie Ballard was the first athlete that Sauvage would coach, and under her guidance, Ballard would go on to win one gold and four silver at the 2005 Summer Down Under event. Sauvage won Sport New South Wales Coach of the Year in 2018, and New South Wales Institute of Sport Coach of the Year in 2021.

== Participation ==
The most recent AusPlay survey published in October 2021 shows great insights into how many people with disabilities participate in sport or other physical activity. The results showed that 52% of adults with a disability participated in sport or other physical activity at least three times per week. While this is significantly lower than adults who do not have a disability (64.4%), it is an increase compared to the ABS statistic published in 2014 that was quoted above. The results also indicated that there is a difference in adult participation between men and women. 70.2% of women, compared to 67.5% of men with disabilities participated in physical activity at least once per week.

=== Promoting participation ===
Participation is promoted by having a positive support network for athletes with disabilities. This support network can include coaches, family members, friends, and teammates. Research has identified that a positive support network in schools is a strong factor promoting participation. As teachers are becoming more aware of inclusion and better trained, they are better equipped to provide a positive environment for students with disabilities. Furthermore, positive school environments and other support networks makes athletes feel more connected to their sport and will enable other facilitators like meeting new friends and having a sense of achievement.

=== Barriers to participation ===
In Australia, there are issues with policy implementation at the local level, which can act as a barrier for disability sport participation. Firstly, Local level clubs often do not have the capacity to develop internal policies to facilitate implementing government policy, and some even see it as extra work that is beyond a club's mission or business model. Secondly, as local sports clubs are largely focused with winning and competition on the court, club representatives see developing inclusionary practices as being conflicting with their winning and competitive culture. Instead of focusing on inclusions, clubs often focus their resources on areas that bring the club prestige, money, and more business. Lastly, some clubs do not know how to implement inclusionary practices.

Competing priorities are another barrier to participation. Either the family, or the athlete themselves (if they are older), often need to balance attending medical review, appointments, and check-ups, which can get in the way of sustained participation in sport. At the individual level, children with disabilities can be self-conscious of their condition and therefore not want to participate. Furthermore, their perceived physical limitations, which include increased risk of injuries, subsequent longer recovery times, tiredness and pain also deter long-term participation.

The onset of the COVID-19 pandemic in Australia and the subsequent lockdown and restrictive border control measures throughout the country created new barriers to participation for individuals with disabilities. At the local level, the closure of sports-related day programs due to lockdown measures presented a large barrier for individuals with disabilities to continue participation in sport during the pandemic, this was due to a lack of space and specialised equipment at home as well as the absence of access to professionally trained instructors. At the elite level, the inter-state travel restrictions, and the fixed quotas and hotel quarantine rues for overseas arrivals made travel for competition and training more onerous and expensive.
