= Hollinswood and Randlay =

Civil parish in Shropshire, England

Coordinates: 52.669°N 2.426°W

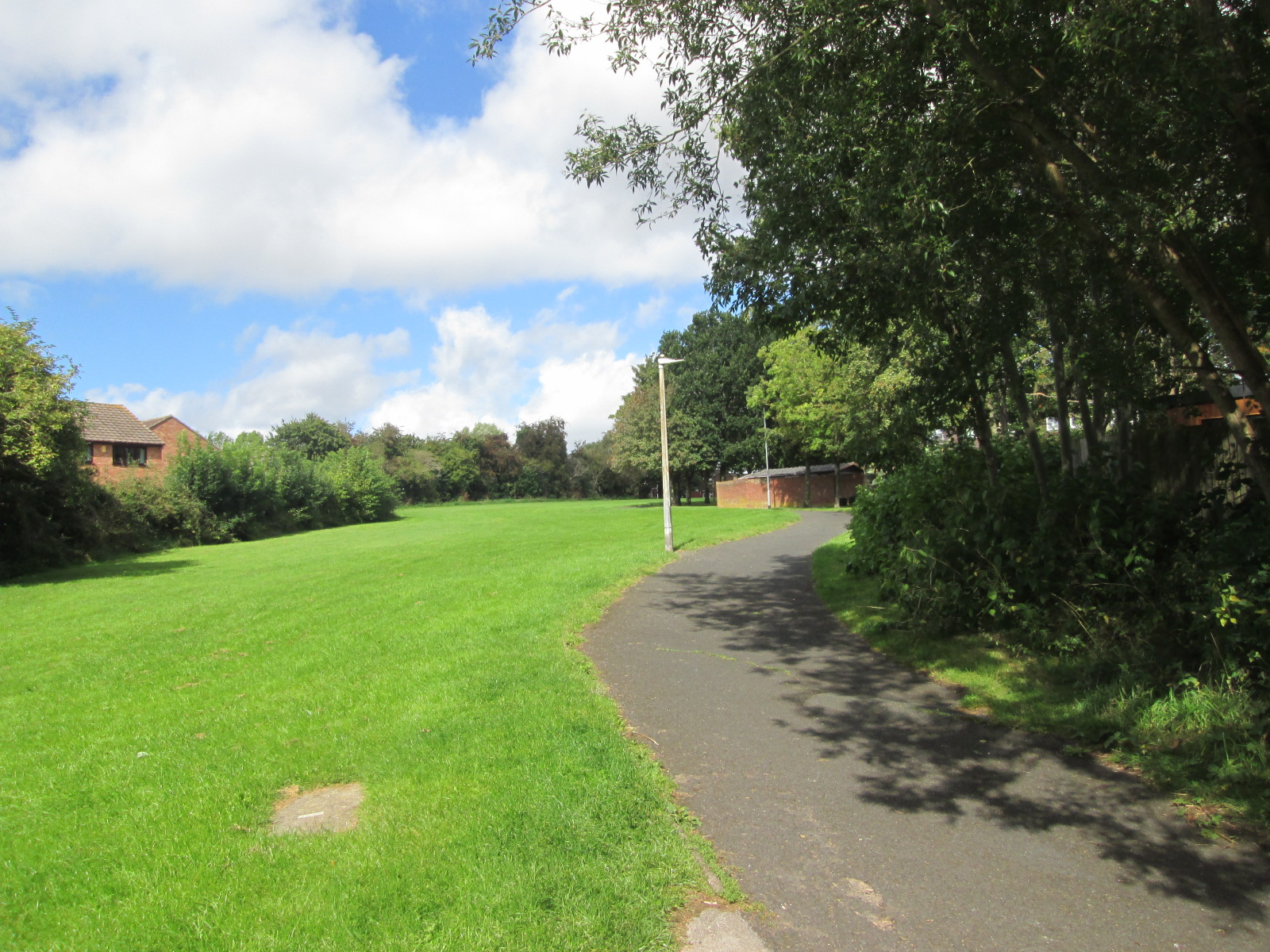
- Footpath through the houses at Randlay

- Location within Shropshire
- Area: 4.568 km^{2} (1.764 sq mi)
- Population: 6,009 (2011 census)
  - Density: 1,315/km^{2} (3,410/sq mi)
- Civil parish: Hollinswood and Randlay
- Unitary authority: Telford and Wrekin
- Ceremonial county: Shropshire
- Region: West Midlands
- Country: England
- Sovereign state: United Kingdom
- Police: West Mercia
- Fire: Shropshire
- Ambulance: West Midlands
- Website: https://www.harpc.gov.uk/

Hollinswood and Randlay is a civil parish in Telford and Wrekin unitary area, in the ceremonial county of Shropshire, England. Hollinswood and Randlay are areas of Telford with historical origins: the Randlay Brickworks operated under this name from 1856, and Hollinswood is derived from "holly wood".

The parish is to the east of Telford town centre, and its northern boundary is the M54 motorway. The A442 road (Queensway) bisects the parish, running from north west to south, and is joined by the A464 road, coming in from the north west, at the Randlay roundabout in the centre of the parish. The area of the parish is 456.5 ha (1.763 sq mi), and its population in the 2011 census was 6,009.

It has a parish council, the lowest level of local government in England.

As of 2024 there are no listed buildings in the parish.

Randlay Valley, in the heart of the parish, is a local nature reserve of 44.5 ha (0.172 sq mi), under the care of Telford and Wrekin Council.
