= Hadley, Shropshire =

Village in Shropshire, England

Coordinates: 52.704°N 2.481°W

Hadley
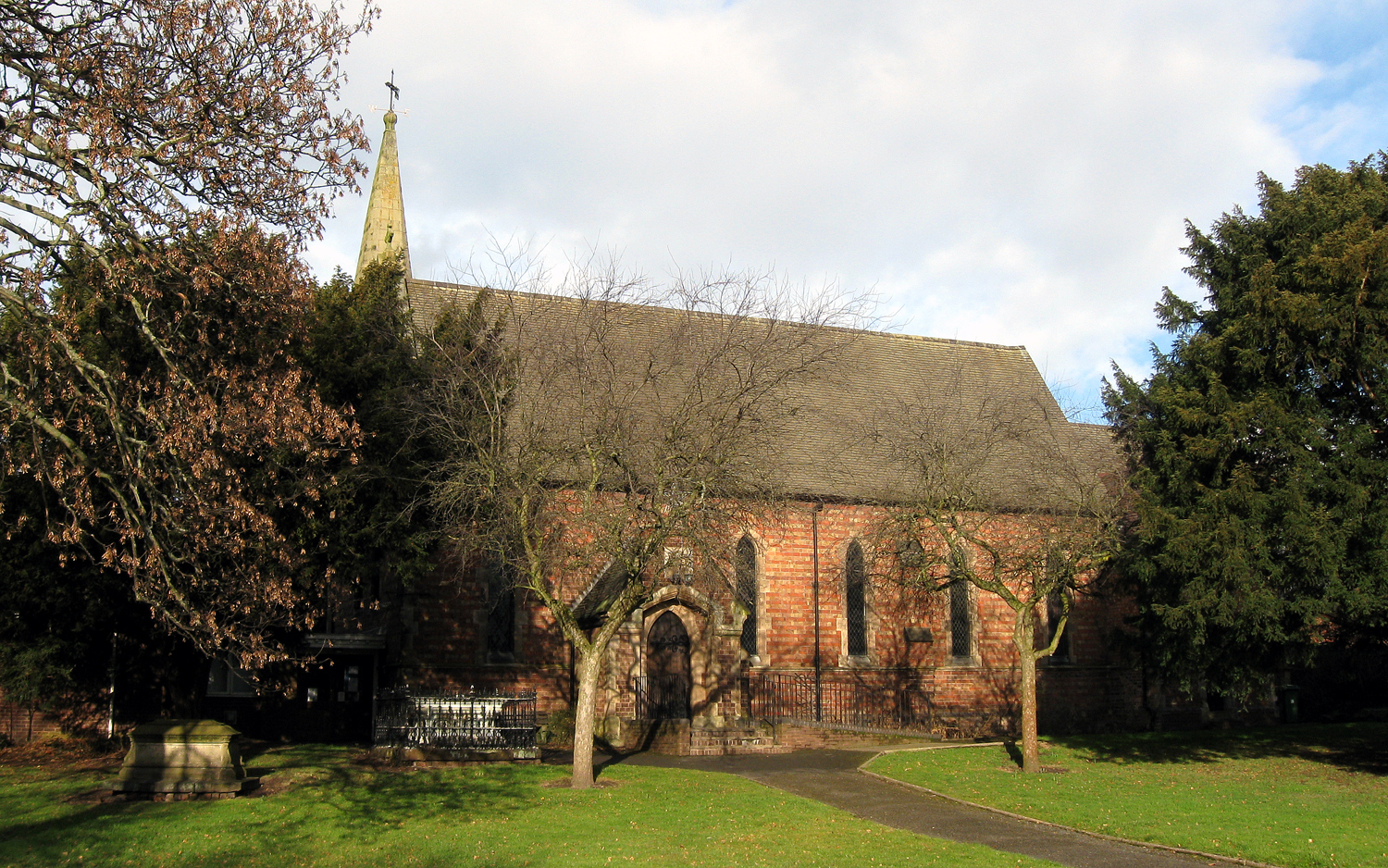
- Holy Trinity parish church

- Location within Shropshire
- Civil parish: Hadley and Leegomery
- Unitary authority: Telford and Wrekin
- Ceremonial county: Shropshire
- Region: West Midlands
- Country: England
- Sovereign state: United Kingdom
- Post town: TELFORD
- Postcode district: TF1
- Dialling code: 01952

Hadley is a village in the civil parish of Hadley and Leegomery in the borough of Telford and Wrekin in Shropshire, England. It neighbours the village of Leegomery.

Hadley, Ketley and Leegomery shown within Telford in Blue.

Hadley is about 3 miles (5 km) north-west of Telford. The population of the civil parish mentioned at the 2011 census was 14,166.

It neighbours Wellington. Wellington's two colleges of Telford College of Arts and Technology (TCAT) and New College (NC), are to the west of Hadley. Ketley is to the south of the village.

Hadley Learning Community, opened in 2006, is a coeducational all-through school for students from 5 – 16 years of age located in Hadley.

Hadley's parish war memorial, to men of Hadley and district who died serving in the two World Wars, is an imitation of the Cenotaph in London's Whitehall. It stands in Manse Road near the Methodist Church.

== Notable people ==
- Diarist Hannah Cullwick lived at a cottage rented in Hadley from 1887 before moving to Shifnal in 1903.
- Jerry Dean (footballer) was born in Hadley in 1881. He became a professional player, notably for Notts County.
- On 13 September 1919, Harry Patch (1898-2009), who became the last surviving British combat soldier of World War I, married his first wife, Ada Billington (1891-1976), at Hadley parish church.
- Len Murray, Baron Murray of Epping Forest, trade union leader, was born in Hadley in 1922.
- Ernie Clements, British racing cyclist, was born in Hadley in 1922.
- The ashes of Dalian Atkinson, footballer, are buried in Hadley cemetery.

== See also ==
- Listed buildings in Hadley and Leegomery
