= England national deaf cricket team =

National sports team

England Deaf Cricket Team represents England and Wales in international Deaf cricket. The team, consisting of players who are Deaf or hearing impaired, is one of the England and Wales Cricket Board's (ECB) four disability teams. Participating in international cricket since 1992, the England Deaf cricket team have been perennial runners-up, achieving this in the 1995/6 and 2005 editions of the Deaf world cups along with the 2011 DICC champions trophy. They are current holders of the Deaf Ashes.

Internationally, Deaf Cricketers must have a minimum hearing loss of 55dB in both ears. On the playing field, players play without their hearing aids/cochlear implants. The England Deaf cricket team has a mixture of BSL users, Sign Supported English users and Spoken English.

The current head coach is Jason Weaver. He is assisted by former captain, Paul Allen.

== Players ==
There are estimated to be over 2,000 Deaf/hearing impaired cricketers in England and Wales.

=== Current squad ===
Name	Batting Style	Bowling Style	Disability Premier League Side	County	Notes
Batters
James Schofield	Right-handed	Right-arm off break	-	Wales	
Cameron Sweeney			Tridents	Yorkshire	Goalkeeper for Sunderland Deaf Football
Umesh Valjee M.B.E.	Right-handed	-	Tridents	Middlesex	2011 England Disability Cricketer of the Year 2011 awarded MBE for services to disabled sport 2012 Deaf Sports Personality of the Year
All-Rounders
Stephen George	Right-handed	Right-arm fast-medium	Pirates	Devon	2014 England Disability Cricketer of the Year
George Greenway	Right-handed	Right-arm fast-medium	Hawks	Devon	Captain 2024 Runner Up - Deaf Sports Personality of the Year
Joel Harris	Right-handed		Tridents	Lancashire	
Jake Oakes	Right-handed	Right-arm medium	Pirates	Middlesex	
Josh Price	Right-handed	Left-arm Off-Break	Black Cats	Surrey	Vice-Captain 2022 England Disability Cricketer of the Year
Henry Wainmann	Right-handed	Left-arm Off-Break	Hawks	Yorkshire	
Bowlers
Matt Bailey	Left-handed	Left-arm fast-medium	Hawks	Shropshire	
Nathan Caddell	Right-handed	Right-arm Medium-Fast	Hawks	Middlesex	
James Dixon	Right-handed	Right-arm fast-medium	Black Cats	Lancashire	
Farooq Mohammed	Right-handed	Right-arm fast-medium	Pirates	Middlesex	
James O'Connor			Black Cats	Yorkshire	Captain of Yorkshire Disability Cricket
Luke Riley		Medium	Tridents	Yorkshire	

== Honours Board ==
Top Scores - International Deaf Cricket
Score	Name	Opponents	Date
186*	Umesh Valjee	Australia	26 January 2004
140	Mike O'Mahony	Pakistan	29 December 1995
129	Umesh Valjee	Australia	18 August 1994
125*	Umesh Valjee	Australia	23 January 2011
121*	Umesh Valjee	South Africa	22 January 2011
117	Phil Ottaway	India	5 January 1996
115	Mike O'Mahony	Australia	7 January 1996
113	Mike O'Mahony	Australia	13 July 2008
107	Ben Young	Nepal	20 November 2005
104*	Umesh Valjee	Australia	18 January 2011
100	Stephen George	South Africa	28 August 2013
100	Umesh Valjee	India	21 November 2005

Top Bowling Figures - International Deaf Cricket
Bowling Figures	Name	Opponents	Date
7-22	George Greenway	South Africa	7 September 2013
7-30	Paul Allen	Australia	18 January 2011
6-40	Gary Probert	Pakistan	29 December 1995
6-61	Umesh Valjee	Australia	21 January 1992
5-6	Umesh Valjee	India	27 December 1995
5-14	Stefan Pichowski	Australia	26 January 2011
5-28	Darrell Sykes	Bangladesh	25 November 2005
5-31	Stephen George	South Africa	1 September 2013
5-32	Mohammed Farooq	Nepal	20 November 2005
5-20	Darrel Sykes	India	21 November 2005
5-61	Nigel Davenport	Pakistan	9 August 2006
5-71	Stephen George	Australia	18 January 2011

== History ==
=== 1990s ===
==== 1992: The first Deaf Ashes ====
Following conversations between deaf cricket pioneers, Steve May, John Webb, Robert Craven and David Morris in 1988, it was agreed to set up the first ever test matches between two international deaf teams. The Great Britain Deaf cricket team fundraised £25,000 with £3500 from the British Deaf Sports Council to host the series.

New Year's Eve 1992, the Great Britain Deaf cricket team arrived in Perth to a warm welcoming party at the Perth Deaf Centre. The first ever test cricket match was played at Perth, unfortunately for the visitors they were defeated by 10 wickets. The following four matches were played in Adelaide, Sydney, Melbourne, and Brisbane. England lost the Ashes 4-0 (one draw).

Current player, Umesh Valjee, was a playing member of the travelling squad. He scored 191 runs in 5 matches, averaging 19.10. Only bettered in the England side by Philip Ottaway who scored 202 runs, averaging 20.20. England's leading wicket takers in this series was Umesh Valjee (10), John Everitt (9), and Peter Jones (9).

==== 1994: Hosting Australia ====
In the summer of 1994, Australia visited England to contest the Deaf Ashes, beating a stronger England side 2–0 in a four-match series to retain the Ashes. The first game was played at Abbeydale Park in South Yorkshire (Sheffield Collegiate Cricket Club's home ground), England batted first and collapsed to 114ao in a mere 63.2 overs. Australia, led by opener Chris Ashenden (scored 212), batted quickly to reach 338/5 before declaring with a lead of 214 runs. GB's response was valiant but to no avail with Australia chasing down 88 runs in the final innings without losing a wicket.

The following games ran in a similar fashion with the weather intervening to prevent an Australian whitewash. There were some notable standout performances from the GB side including: Umesh Valjee's 129 runs (first-ever GB test hundred) and 4–81 in the final game; Ross MacCauliffe’ 4–22 in the second game; and Philip Ottaway's 96 in the first game.

==== 1995: First Deaf ODI World Cup (Victoria, Australia) ====
The first Deaf Cricket World Cup was hosted by Deaf Cricket Australia in Victoria. Despite losing their first game against India, England steamed through the round-robin stages, comfortably beating Sri-Lanka, Pakistan, South Africa, before reaching the Semi-Finals where they once again faced India. This time round, they it was the English who came up top, scoring 245 with Phillip Ottaway scoring a surprise 117 and Umesh controversially mankaded for 96. The English bowlers fired up, bowled India out for 207 to reach the final where Australia awaited.

In the final, England batted first against the hosts, they scored 261/6 from their 50 overs. Mike O'Mahony top scoring with 116. However, in front of a raucous crowd, the Australians led by their skipper, held their nerve to chase it down in 47 overs. England return home, runners up.

=== 2000s ===
==== 2004: Visiting Australia ====
After an eight-year break from international cricket, England returned to Australia in 2004 to contest the third Deaf Ashes. They played five ODIs and three Tests in five weeks visiting Sydney, Brisbane and Melbourne. They lost majority of their games. Australia whitewashing the visitors in the ODI series (5-0) and the cherry on top for the hosts, retaining the Deaf Ashes once again (1-0). Umesh Valjee's 186*, a memorable moment for the visitors.

Umesh Valjee top-scored in the series with 494 runs (averaging 54.89) supported by Mike O'Mahony with 357 runs (32.45) and Ben Young with 313 runs (averaging 28.45). Ross MacCauliffe being the pick of the bowlers with 10 wickets and Stefan Pichowski snatching 7 wickets. Darrell Sykes, Paul Allen and Mark Woodman all taking 6 wickets.

==== 2005: Deaf Cricket ODI World Cup (Lucknow, India) ====
England flew to India with high hopes, however after a tough start, losing three of their first four games. They stumbled into the semi-final with a convincing win over New Zealand (winning by 178 runs). They beat their old foe, Australia, in the Semi-Final. Paul Allen taking 4–25 to restrict the Aussies to 153, which England chased down in 43 overs despite some tense moments.

India awaited them in the final at the K.D. Singh Babu Stadium. Umesh Valjee won the toss and put the hosts into bat. India scored a highly competitive 193, taking advantage of some wayward bowling from the visitors. India took regular wickets to win their first World Cup. England runners-up again.

==== 2006: Hosting Pakistan ====
England hosted Pakistan for the first time in 2006. They played five games, which formed 2 ODIs, 2 T20s and one Test. It was a well-contested series which resulted in 2 wins for the hosts and 2 wins for the visitors and a drawn Test.

Mike O'Mahony returned to form with the bat scoring 170 runs from his 6 innings. Ben Young followed up his good World Cup with 152 runs from his 6 innings. Newcomer, Blyth Duncan was the pick of the bowlers with 10 wickets (averaging 8.3), Nigel Davenport also took 10 wickets across the series.

=== 2010s - The ECB era Begins ===
==== 2011: Mixed Fortunes in Australia ====
Deaf Ashes

England played one test match against Australia to contest the 2011 Deaf Ashes. England started well, bowling Australia out for 157, the pick of the bowlers was Paul Allen taking 4/65, supported by Debutant George Greenway who took his first international wicket. In response, Umesh's century (104*) took England into a slender 28 run first inning lead.

Australia sensing a possible defeat grinded through several sessions ending with 246ao (Stephen George 5/72 and Paul Allen 4/65), a lead of 218. England went about their chase in a hurry in search of a win, unfortunately time was not on their side despite James Schofield's best efforts (74*), England ended on 129/7 and Australia retained the Deaf Ashes.

Tri-Series

This was followed by White-ball Tri-Series between Australia, England and South Africa which was organised into two competitions; ODIs and T20s.

After convincingly beating both South Africa and Australia in the round robin matches. England lost the ODI series final to Australia. England were bowled out for a misery 62 all out which was easily chased by the hosts for the loss of one wicket.

England had better luck in the t20 series, beating Australia after restricting the hosts to 90/9 off 20 overs. England's top three got them over the line to win the T20 series.

==== 2013: South Africa Whitewash ====
England visited South Africa in September 2013 to contest the first Deaf cricket international series in South Africa. The series was hosted by Northerns Cricket Union at Sinovich Park.

England proved too strong for the hosts having completed a 6–0 series win. Particular highlights for the visitors included two-hundred opening partnership between Umesh Valjee and James Schofield (both falling for 95), Stephen George's first international century, and George Greenway's memorable 7-22.

Stephen George was awarded disability cricketer of the year 2013 due to his performances across the series.

==== 2016: DICC Championship (Dubai, UAE) ====
The DICC championship in 2016 was contested between England, India, Pakistan and South Africa. After the first game against South Africa was abandoned due to weather, England beat Pakistan by 16 runs in their second game. In an essentially knock-out game between England and India, India was controversially found to be breaking International Deaf Cricket regulations due to a player wearing a hearing aid, which meant they were forced to forfeit and England were through to the final.

England lost to Pakistan in the final at Sharjah Stadium. England batted first scoring 225/6 from 50 overs with contributions from Umesh Valjee (63), Sam Critchard (54) and Paul Allen (45*). Pakistan, led by Waqas (76), chased it down in 48.4 overs despite Paul Allen's best efforts (3-54).

=== 2020s ===
==== 2022: England win the Deaf Ashes for the first time ====
In the summer of 2022, England headed to Brisbane, Australia to contest the Deaf Ashes. Once again Australia were favourites having never lost against the English in an Ashes Series (4-0). However, a resurgent England Side led by George Greenway, won the Ashes in convincing style winning 6 of the 8 games (6-2).

The Ashes was contested over two series, a 5 match T20 series and a 3 match ODI series. England took a 3-2 lead from T20 series into the ODI series, which they went on to win 3-0 to secure their Ashes victory.

Josh Price won the player of the series, he averaged 32 with the bat which included a match winning knocks of 83 and 82 in the ODI series. He also took 10 wickets across the Ashes. He was awarded Lord's Taverner's Disability Cricketer of the Year for 2022.

There were also memorable batting performances from George Greenway (63, 52*), Stephen George (57*) and James Schofield (59*). Henry Wainmann was the highest wicket taker with 11 wickets.

==== 2023/4: T20 Deaf World Cup ====
The DICC Deaf World Cup was due to be contested between eight sides in Qatar in early December 2023 (3rd-12th). However, due to "prevailing challenges and uncertainties in the region", the Qatar Cricket Association had postponed the tournament. England did not attend the rearranged World Cup which was played three months later in Sharjah, UAE.

==== 2024: Hosting India (T20 series) ====
India visited England in the summer 2024 to play a 7 match bilateral T20 series. India won the series 5-2.

Despite being bowled out for 95 in the opening game, England secured a victory through a rain-affected Duckworth-Lewis-Stern result, with Matt Bailey's two early wickets giving them the edge as the rain fell.

India then took a 2-1 lead by winning a doubleheader at Kidderminster Cricket Club, where Sai Akash shone with scores of 53 and 65 in the two matches. England bounced back in the fourth game at Northampton Cricket Ground with a remarkable win, led by Josh Price's unbeaten 69 in an impressive chase.

Heading into a doubleheader at Astwood Bank CC, India delivered a dominant performance with both bat and ball, securing victories in both games to clinch the series. Sai Akash was outstanding again, scoring 50 runs off 26 balls in one of the matches. The series concluded at the Uptonsteel County Ground, where India successfully chased down a target of 163 to win the final game.

- India: Player of the series - Sai Akash
- England: Player of the series - Josh Price
- Moment of the series - James Schofield (Eng) Catch.
