= Apley Castle =

Medieval fortified manor in England

- Hadley, Shropshire, England
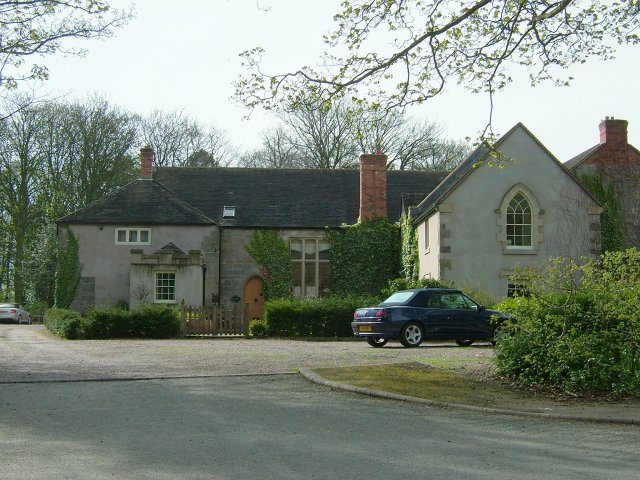
- Converted stableblock, containing remains of original castle

Site information
- Type: Fortified manor house
- Owner: Private
- Condition: Inhabited

Location
- Shown within Shropshire
- Coordinates: 52.7152°N 2.5122°W

Apley Castle was a medieval fortified manor in the village of Hadley, Shropshire, England.

== History ==
Apley Castle was a moated, fortified manor house in Hadley near Wellington. By the early 14th century the manor was owned by the Charlton family, who had become major landowners in the region, and in 1327 Sir Alan Charlton received a licence to crenellate the manor house. The building work occurred shortly afterwards, producing a square building set around a central courtyard. Charlton's descendants expanded the castle considerably into an Elizabethan mansion during the late 16th and early 17th century, using grey ashlar stone.

Margaret Charlton, the religious non-conformist, was born here in 1636. She would be a supporter and later wife of Richard Baxter. In 1642 the castle passed by marriage to Thomas Hanmer, who married Margaret's mother (and very recent widow) Mary Charlton. With the outbreak of the English Civil War that year between the supporters of King Charles and Parliament, Hanmer, a royalist, fortified the mansion, which formed a valuable strategic stronghold close to Shrewsbury. Encouraged by Francis Charlton's younger brother, the castle was sacked by Parliamentary forces during the war: £1,500 of damage was done and the lead from the roof was stolen for use at Shrewsbury Castle. Hanmer was taken prisoner and Mary Hanmer managed to recover both her children and the castle in order that her son Francis Charlton could become its heir.

A second mansion, also called Apley Castle, was subsequently built between 1791 and 1794 for the Charltons, and the repaired first castle was reused as the stableblock for this building. This building was demolished in 1955, and the stables fell into disrepair. In 1996, the stables, including their medieval elements, were renovated and turned into a private house. The site is a Grade II* listed building.

== See also ==
- Castles in Great Britain and Ireland
- List of castles in England

== Bibliography ==
- Emery, Anthony. (2000) Greater Medieval Houses of England and Wales, 1300-1500: East Anglia, Central England and Wales. Cambridge: Cambridge University Press. ISBN 978-0-521-58131-8.
- Mackenzie, James D. (1896) The Castles of England: Their Story and Structure, Vol II. New York: Macmillan. OCLC 504892038.
