= Charlton School =

Location
- Apley Avenue; Wellington; Telford, Shropshire, TF1 3FA; England
- Coordinates: 52°42′51″N 2°31′22″W

Information
- Type: Academy
- Mottoes: "Scientia veritas est' (Knowledge is truth); Taking PRIDE In Progress Through Partnership With Learning At The Heart Of All We Do
- Established: 1962 (as Wellington Girls' Modern School; renamed 1974)
- Local authority: Telford and Wrekin Council
- Trust: Learning Community Trust
- Department for Education URN: 142821 Tables
- Ofsted: Reports
- Chair of Governors: Rob Hewer
- Principal: Sarah Barton
- Gender: Coeducational
- Age: 11 to 16
- Enrolment: 1133
- Houses: Willow, Sycamore, Birch, Hawthorn
- Colours: Navy & Gold
- Website: http://www.charlton.uk.com/

Charlton School is a coeducational secondary school located in Telford, Shropshire, England.

In May 2024 the school was graded “good” by Ofsted.

Charlton School works in partnership with Dothill Primary School, forming the 'Dothill and Charlton Sports and Learning Community'. Both schools until July 2015 were under the principalship of Mr N Renshaw with each school supported by a Head of Secondary and Head of Primary Phase. However, as of September 2015 both schools have their own leadership.

Charlton school is now run by the Learning Community Trust.

In September 2025, Sarah Barton was appointed as the new principal, following the departure of Andrew McNaughton who had been the head for nine years.

== History ==
Founded in 1962 as Wellington Girls' Modern School, the school was originally an all-girls school. In 1974 it became co-educational and was renamed The Charlton School.

The school's catchment area includes the small towns surrounding it like Wellington and Bratton. In 2003 a sports hall was built and in the following year the school became a science college.

Since 2016, the school is located on a purpose-built site on the previous Blessed Robert Johnson School (Which was a Catholic college) in Wellington.

Previously a foundation school administered by Telford and Wrekin Council, in December 2018 Charlton School converted to academy status. The school is now sponsored by the Learning Community Trust.

In November 2020, footage circulated on social media reportedly showing a Sikh student being attacked by two students in Charlton School uniform. West Mercia Police confirmed they were aware of the video and were treating it as a hate crime. Charlton School said it had taken "swift, immediate and appropriate action" over the incident on 13 November, including sanctions and targeted intervention for the perpetrators.
