= Hadley Learning Community =

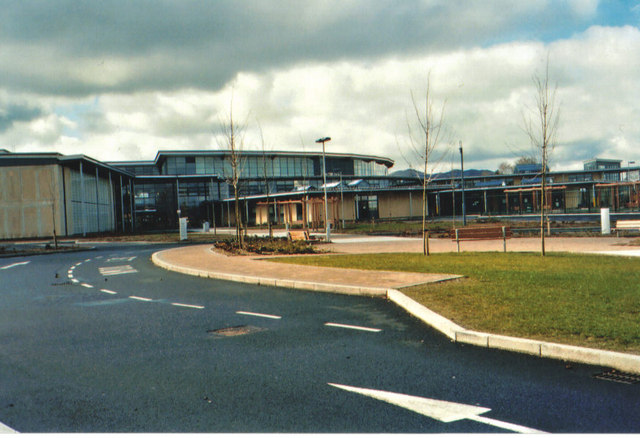

Location
- Waterloo Road; Hadley; Telford, Shropshire, TF1 5NU; England; 52°42′05″N 2°28′48″W

Information
- Type: Academy
- Motto: Our Community, Our School
- Established: 1 September 2006
- Local authority: Telford and Wrekin Council
- Trust: Learning Community Trust
- Department for Education URN: 144853 Tables
- Ofsted: Reports
- Heads of School: Ben Evans; Dan Roycroft
- Gender: Coeducational
- Age: 5 to 16
- Enrolment: 1580
- Website: http://www.hadleylearningcommunity.org.uk

Hadley Learning Community (HLC) is a coeducational all-through school, for students from 3 – 16 years of age, located in the village of Hadley in Telford and Wrekin in Shropshire, England

== Description ==
Hadley Learning Community facilities include a secondary school, a primary school, nurseries and special needs schools, in addition to community facilities for sports, called The Circle, with a swimming pool and fitness suite, as well as a public library, coffee shop, theatre and dance studio, all for public use.

Programs at HLC include:

- Local Authority maintained nursery with places for 60 children who attend either a morning or afternoon session in a group of 30, and also a privately run nursery.
- Primary phase, for 5-11 year olds with places for 60 children in two classes in each year group.
- Secondary phase, for 11-16 year olds with places for 240 students in each year group.
- Special School, The Bridge, with places for 160 children, co-located on the campus, for children with severe and profound disabilities.
- Special School, Queensway, with places for 40 children who have an SEN statement with a diagnosis of autistic spectrum disorder (ASC)
- A Family Centre with children's services and an early intervention team

HLC is a member of the Learning Community Trust.

== History ==
Hadley Learning Community opened on 1 September 2006, a £70 million PFI project, in partnership with Interserve, (now Mitie).

Synetrix provided the information and communication technology infrastructure for the opening of the Hadley Learning Community, including training programmes for teaching staff.

Previously a community school administered by Telford and Wrekin Council, Hadley Learning Community converted to academy status in March 2018.

Telford College formed a partnership with the Learning Community Trust in 2019, allowing HLC and other secondary schools to explore "joint delivery of some post-16 education, as well as staging 'masterclasses' which give secondary school students a taste of college life".

In 2020, Hadley Learning Community opened a Careers and Enterprise Hub, a one-stop-shop for careers advice and mentoring, supported by local businesses and community organisations. As a result, HLC received "Gold accreditation for meeting all eight of the internationally recognised Gatsby Benchmarks, for best careers provision in secondary schools".

There were two special events with Hadley Learning Community primary children in 2022. First, HLC hosted the launch of a children's novel, Leon's Magic Mantra, with Olympic diver Leon Taylor and author Sarah Griffiths. Second, the HLC children's choir was one of only five choirs in England selected to participate in a national choir, singing Keane's Somewhere Only We Know as part of nationwide BBC Children in Need coverage.

== School ratings ==
In 2012, based on students' GCSE scores, the country's Department for Education recognised Hadley Learning Community as "one of the top 100 schools in the country to have continuously improved". Minister of State for Schools Nick Gibb MP congratulated "staff, governors and pupils for their hard work and success". He thanked the management of the school for "leadership in continuing the drive towards the highest standards and educational achievement".

According to its 2022 Ofsted report, "This is a school which sits at the heart of the local community. Pupils are proud to attend here, and wear their uniform with pride... Leaders understand the community they serve exceptionally well. They have developed a highly ambitious and inclusive curriculum... parents are highly complimentary about the school's work." Ofsted rated both primary and secondary phases "Good" after its 2022 and 2023 inspections.
