= Trench, Shropshire =

Village in Shropshire, England

Coordinates: 52.711°N 2.459°W

Trench
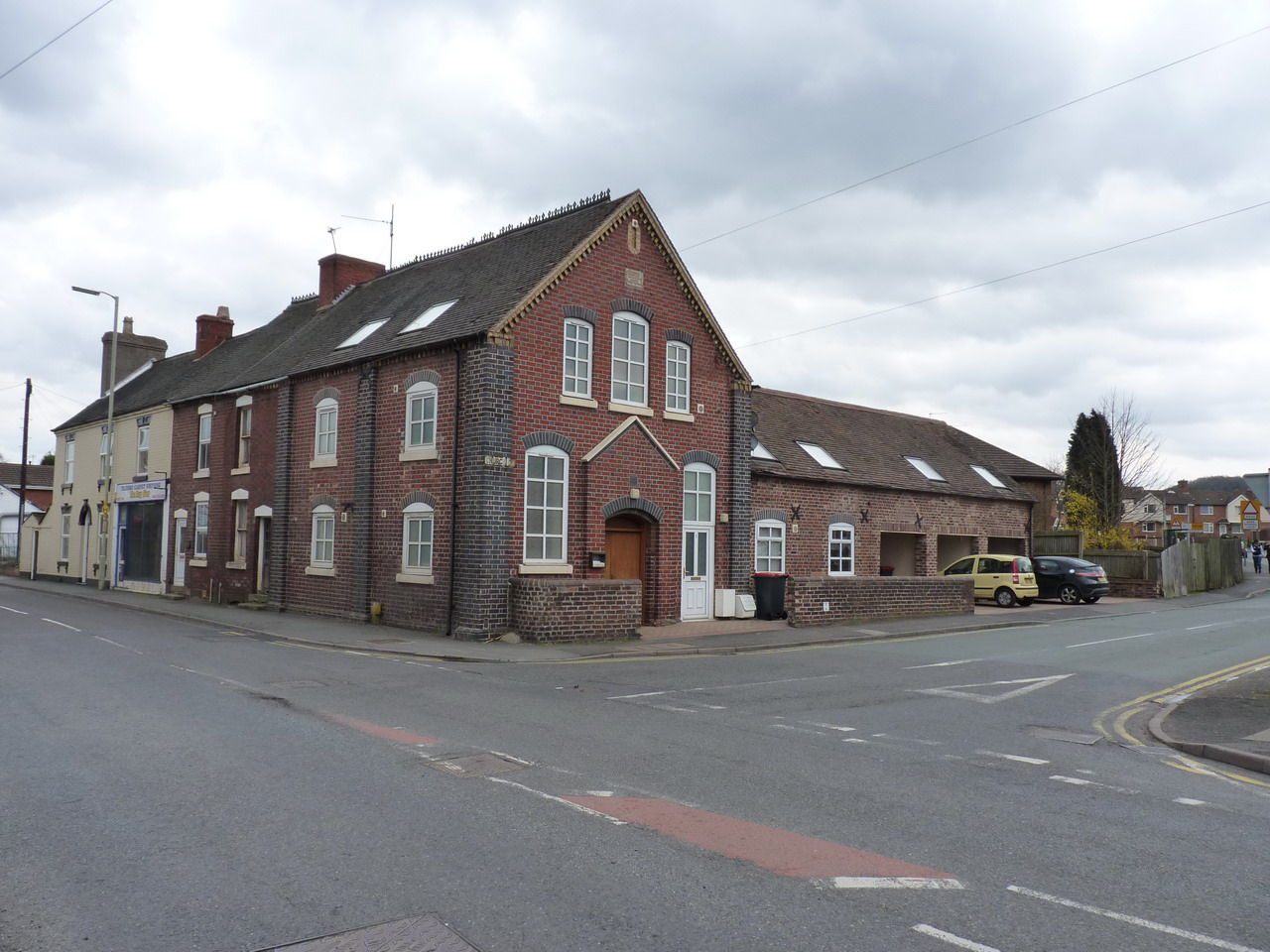
- The Bethesda Primitive Methodist Chapel, Trench

- Trench (and Donnington) shown within Telford in Sky Blue.

- Location within Shropshire
- OS grid reference: SJ705131
- Civil parish: Wrockwardine Wood and Trench
- Unitary authority: Telford and Wrekin
- Ceremonial county: Shropshire
- Region: West Midlands
- Country: England
- Sovereign state: United Kingdom
- Post town: TELFORD
- Postcode district: TF2
- Dialling code: 01952
- Police: West Mercia
- Fire: Shropshire
- Ambulance: West Midlands
- UK Parliament: The Wrekin

Trench is a village in the Telford and Wrekin borough of Shropshire, England. It lies within the Wrockwardine Wood and Trench civil parish.

== Canal Inclined Plane ==
It was once the site of an inclined plane connecting the now-abandoned Shrewsbury Canal and a smaller canal, the Wombridge Canal, 75 feet (23 m) higher in elevation and part of the east Shropshire canal network. The Trench Inclined Plane ceased operations in 1921 having been built in 1793. It was the last working canal inclined plane.

== Etymology ==
The area is believed to get its name from a clearing in woodland (Horton Wood).

== Roads and development ==
Trench Road is an ancient byway and was previously known as Trench Way (before 18th Century) and for a period Trench Lane. This byway connected the towns of Newport and Wellington and was a well known route by 1288.

Trench road was the southern boundary of the village of Horton and the northern boundary of Wrockwardine Wood. Hence Trench was split into the two townships. Trench Farm was located along this road and by 17th Century the road developed with various shops and public houses appearing.

Following World War I the area of Trench started to develop. Woodhouse Crescent had been built by the early 1920s, the area from Trench Road going south (between present Wombridge Road and Church Road) was an army camp and then during the 1960s and 70s the area from Trench Road to Teagues Bridge Lane had turned into a housing estate.

== Notable people ==
- Olympian track and field athlete Robbie Brightwell (1939-2022) was educated at Trench Secondary Modern School in the 1950s.
- Aston Villa footballer Dalian Atkinson (1968-2016) was brought up in Trench, where he died after an incident with police outside his father's house there.

== See also ==
- Canals of the United Kingdom
- History of the British canal system
