= Telford College =

Coordinates: 52.697°N 2.498°W

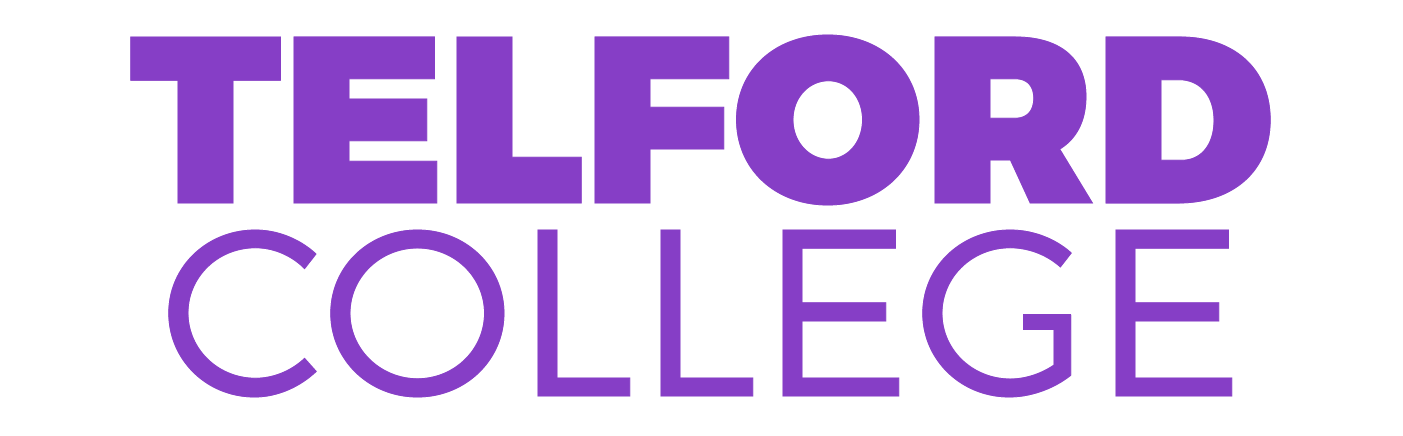

Location
- Haybridge Road, Wellington; Telford, Shropshire, TF1 2NP; England

Information
- Type: Further education college
- Motto: Define your future
- Established: 1892 (2017 as Telford College)
- Founder: Charles Clement Walker
- Local authority: Telford and Wrekin
- Department for Education URN: 130796 Tables
- Ofsted: Reports
- Chair: Gail Bleasby
- Principal: Lawrence Wood (Principal & CEO)
- Age: 16+
- Enrolment: 1,300 (full time) and 6,700 (part time)
- Telephone: 01952 642200
- Website: www.telfordcollege.ac.uk

Telford College is a further education college in Telford, Shropshire, England. It operates from one main site and many in-company training sites and community-based courses spread out across Shropshire and the whole of the United Kingdom.

== Course provision ==
The college offers vocational courses including NVQs, professional, preparatory degree and tailor-made programmes. Since its merger with New College Telford, it has offered 22 A-level qualifications and became the second largest A-level provider in Shropshire after Shrewsbury Sixth Form College.

It has over 16,000 students: 1200 full-time, 15,000 part-time.

As of 2025, the college's most recent inspection by Ofsted was in 2024, with an outcome of Good.

== History ==
The college was founded in 1892 by Charles Walker as the Centre for Art and Science Classes, and was originally in Oakengates, Shropshire. From 1913 until the Second World War it was in the former Coffee House and Recreation Centre in Market Street has been demolished by the Telford Development Corporation. The college moved to a new site, built in 1926, in Hartsbridge Road, as the Walker Technical College. In the 1960s it opened a larger campus on Haybridge Road in Wellington which became the part of the new town of Telford. On 1 January 1983 the college was renamed Telford College of Arts and Technology, commonly abbreviated as TCAT (pronounced /ˈtiːkæt/ TEE-kat). The Bridge Centre (literacy and numeracy department) opened in 1990 followed by a learning resource centre and the Haybridge Restaurant in 1997.

The college's pre merger logo. The bridge symbol was used from c.1990 until 2017.

On 16 October 2012 the Construction Centre, converted from the old sports hall, was officially opened by Tony Gray CEO of the Southwater Event Group. In May 2013 the Discovery and Oakdene Centres opened; the Discovery Centre covers engineering and technology, and the Oakdene Centre is for foundation learning and independent skills. In 2015 the college's Willow Tree Centre was opened, for pupils with complex needs or who are disabled.

In September 2017 the college merged with New College, Telford, forming Telford College. The college continued to use the two existing campuses until September 2018, with New College keeping its separate identity until then, when all students were moved to the existing Haybridge Road campus with a further £2 million investment in a new facility.

In May 2026, the two storey Haybridge Library was opened by former student and author Emma Cooper, the Principal & CEO Lawrence Wood and a student council member.

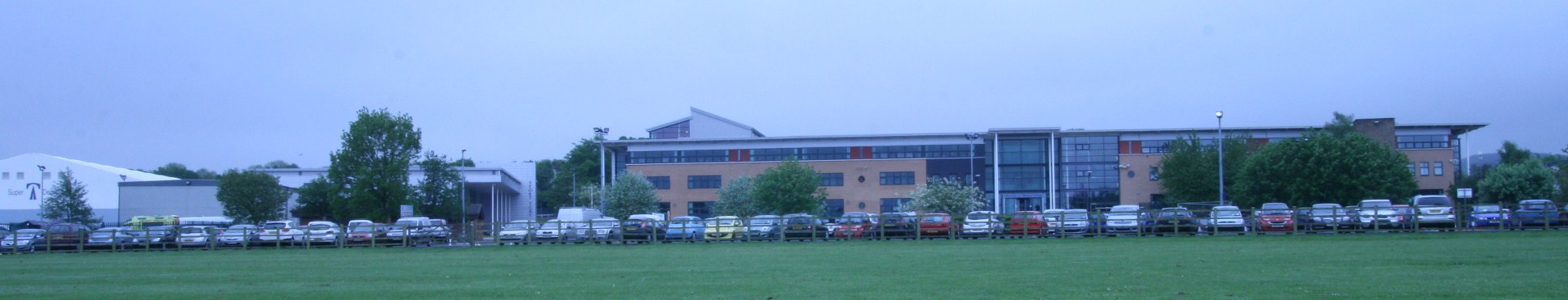
the campus, viewed from the north, in May 2013.

== Restaurant ==
In January 2014 the Orange Tree Restaurant, purchased by the college and converted from the Telford and Wrekin Council's Social Education Centre within the campus, opened for the teaching of catering courses and is open to the public once a week.

== Automotive engineering centre ==
The college has an automotive engineering centre, opened in 2014. The official opening was performed on 7 November 2014 by British touring car champion Matt Neal.

== Gallery ==
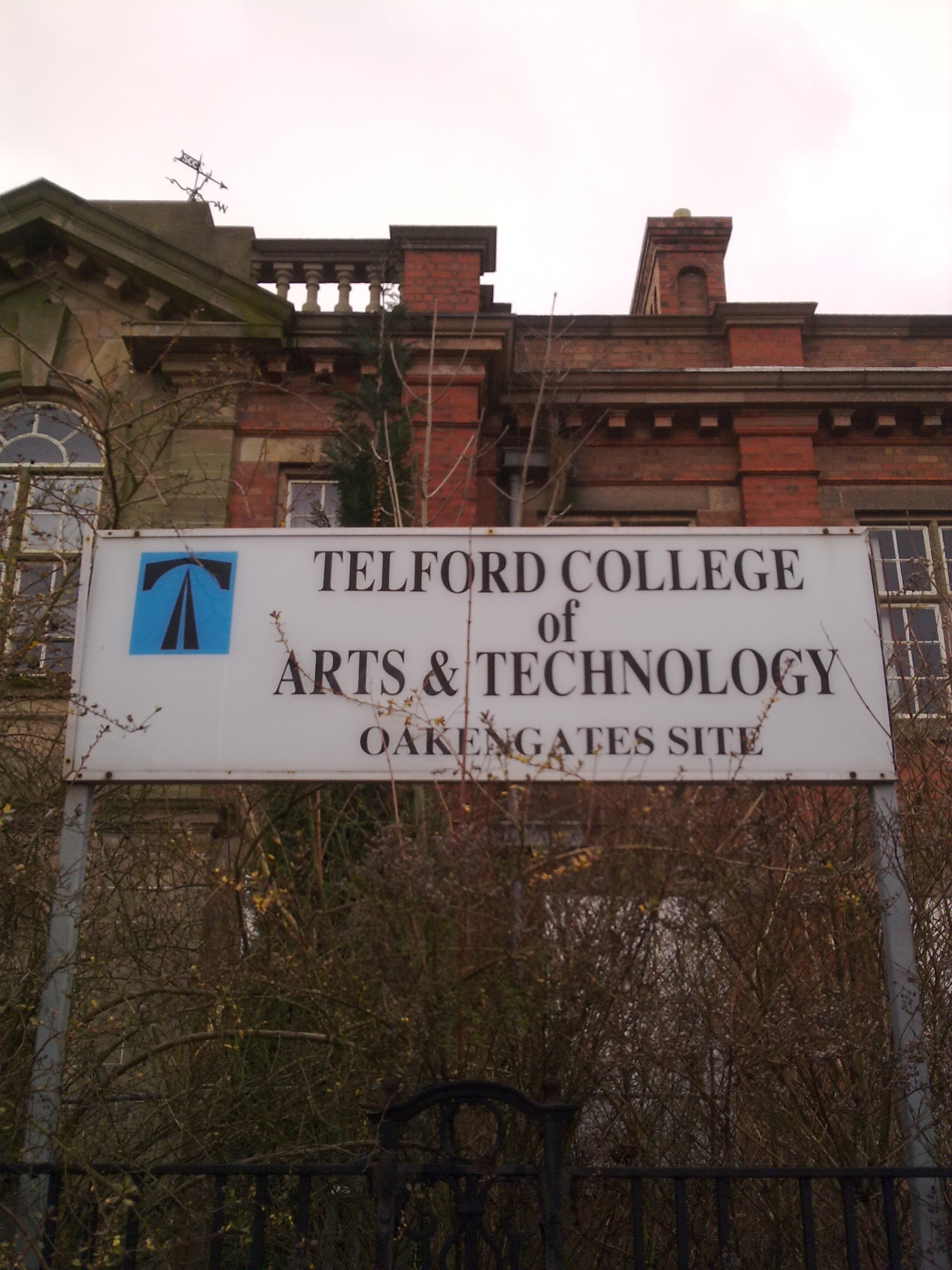
The old Oakengates Site (now closed) on Hartsbridge Road in March 2010. The building has since been sold.

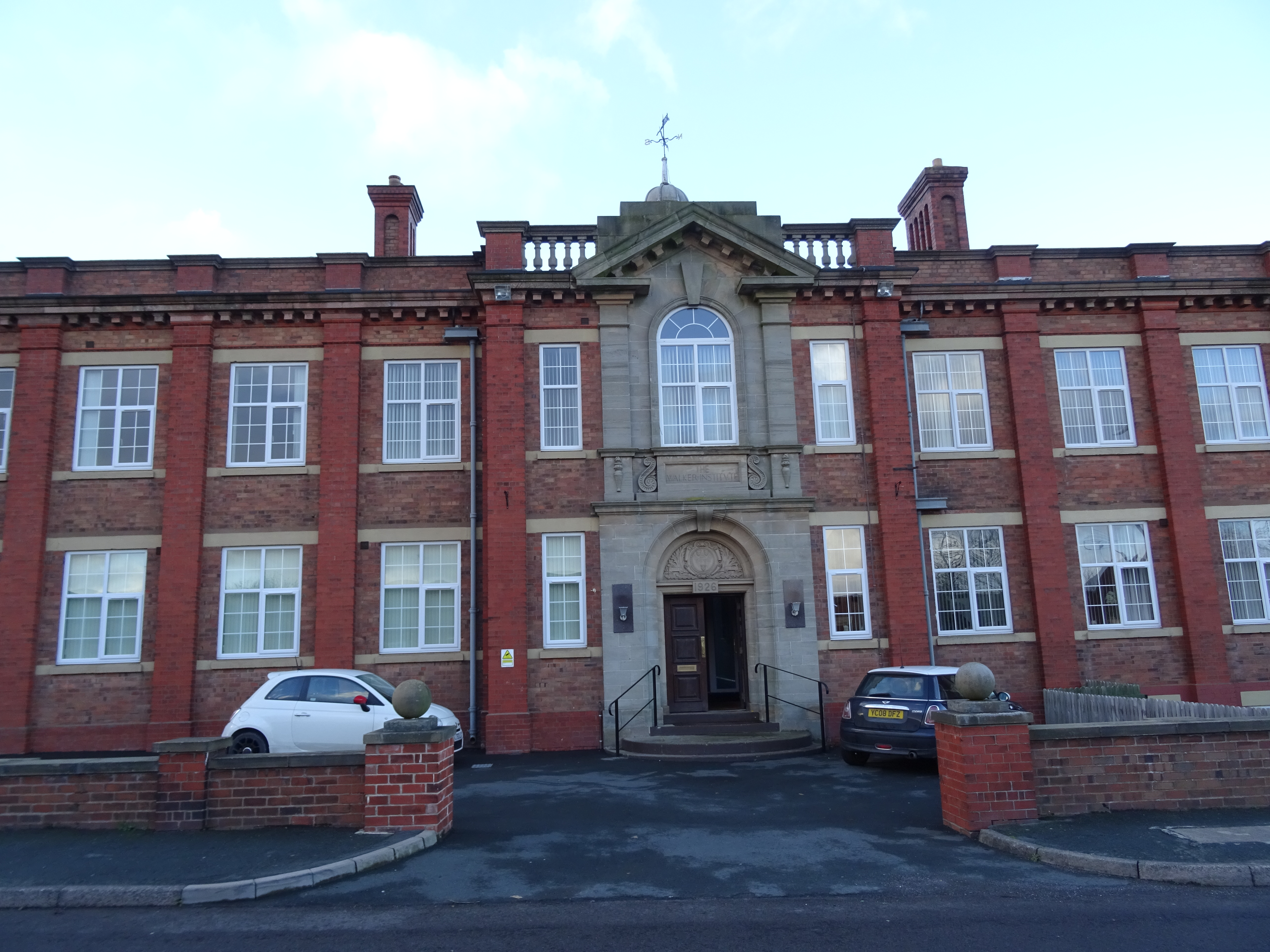
Old Oakengates site in 2018 following conversion into apartments.
