= Gnosall Heath =

Village in Staffordshire, England

Coordinates: 52.779971°N 2.261637°W

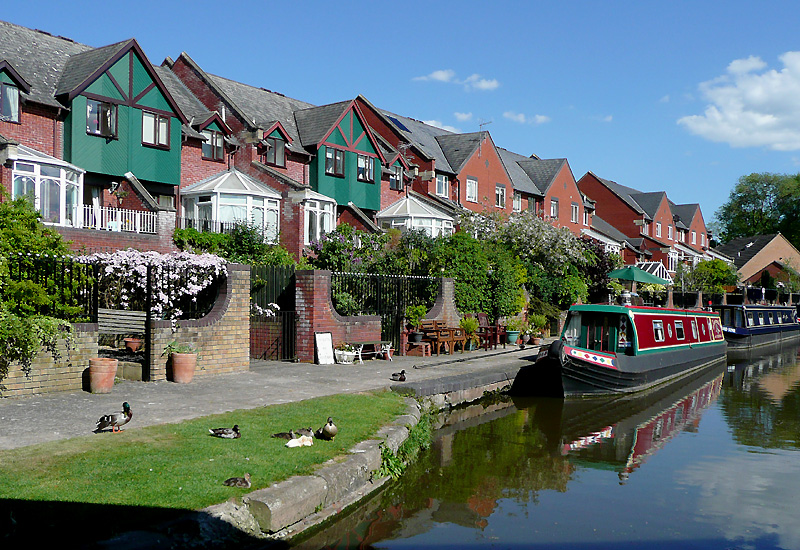
- Canal-side houses in Gnosall Heath, adjacent to the Shropshire Union Canal

- Location within Staffordshire
- OS grid reference: SJ824202
- Civil parish: Gnosall
- District: Stafford
- Shire county: Staffordshire
- Region: West Midlands
- Country: England
- Sovereign state: United Kingdom
- Post town: STAFFORD
- Postcode district: ST20
- Dialling code: 01785
- Police: Staffordshire
- Fire: Staffordshire
- Ambulance: West Midlands
- UK Parliament: Stafford

Gnosall Heath is a village in the Stafford district, in Staffordshire, England and is part of Gnosall civil parish.

== History ==
Gnosall Heath is mentioned as far back as the 17th century. Industrial activity occurred during the Victorian era. There was a timber yard and brickworks in the village. The opening of the Shropshire Union Canal, further developed the village with canal traffic. Additionally, the construction of the "Royal Oak" pub and the Methodist Church, further helped the village to grow.

== Amenities ==
The village's main shopping district is located on both Newport Road/A158 and Wharf Road.

Some notable amenities in Gnosall Heath include:

- The Navigation Inn - A pub located across the Shropshire Union Canal.
- The Boat Inn - A pub located near the Shropshire Union Canal.
- The Acorn - A restaurant located midway between Gnosall Heath and Gnosall.
- Cowley Tunnel - A tunnel that the Shropshire Union Canal passes under.

== Transport ==
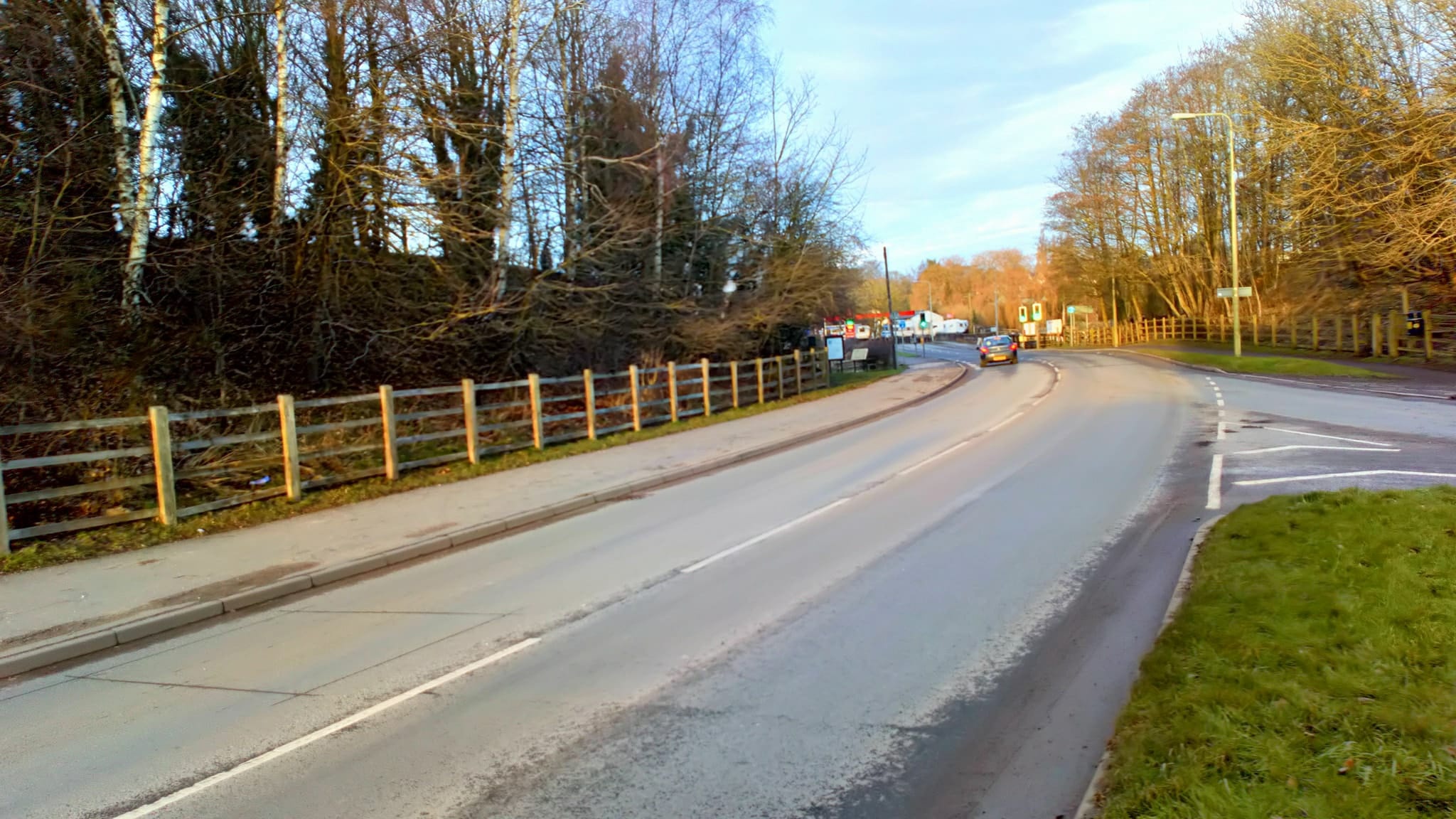
Site of Gnosall railway station

Gnosall Heath is served by regular buses between Stafford, Newport and Telford.

The nearest active rail stations to the village are Stafford, Shifnal, Cosford, Telford Central and Stone.

The village was served by neighbouring Gnosall's railway station on the former Stafford–Shrewsbury line between Newport and Stafford. However, it was closed in 1964. Although the line was closed between Donnington and Stafford, the Telford International Railfreight Park opened on the Shropshire end of the former line in 2009 and restored part of the route between Wellington and Trench. This did not restore the entire route to allow a connection to either the West Coast Main Line at Stafford or the Wolverhampton–Shrewsbury line at Wellington for freight and passenger services.

There are some aspirations to reopen the entire route between Wellington and Stafford once again, but development at Donnington, Newport and Stafford have hindered any potential to reuse the entire former line.

Today, the former station site and trackbed at Gnosall Heath is part of a greenway between Newport and Stafford.
