= Trench Crossing railway station =

Railway station in Shropshire, England (1854–1964)

Trench Crossing
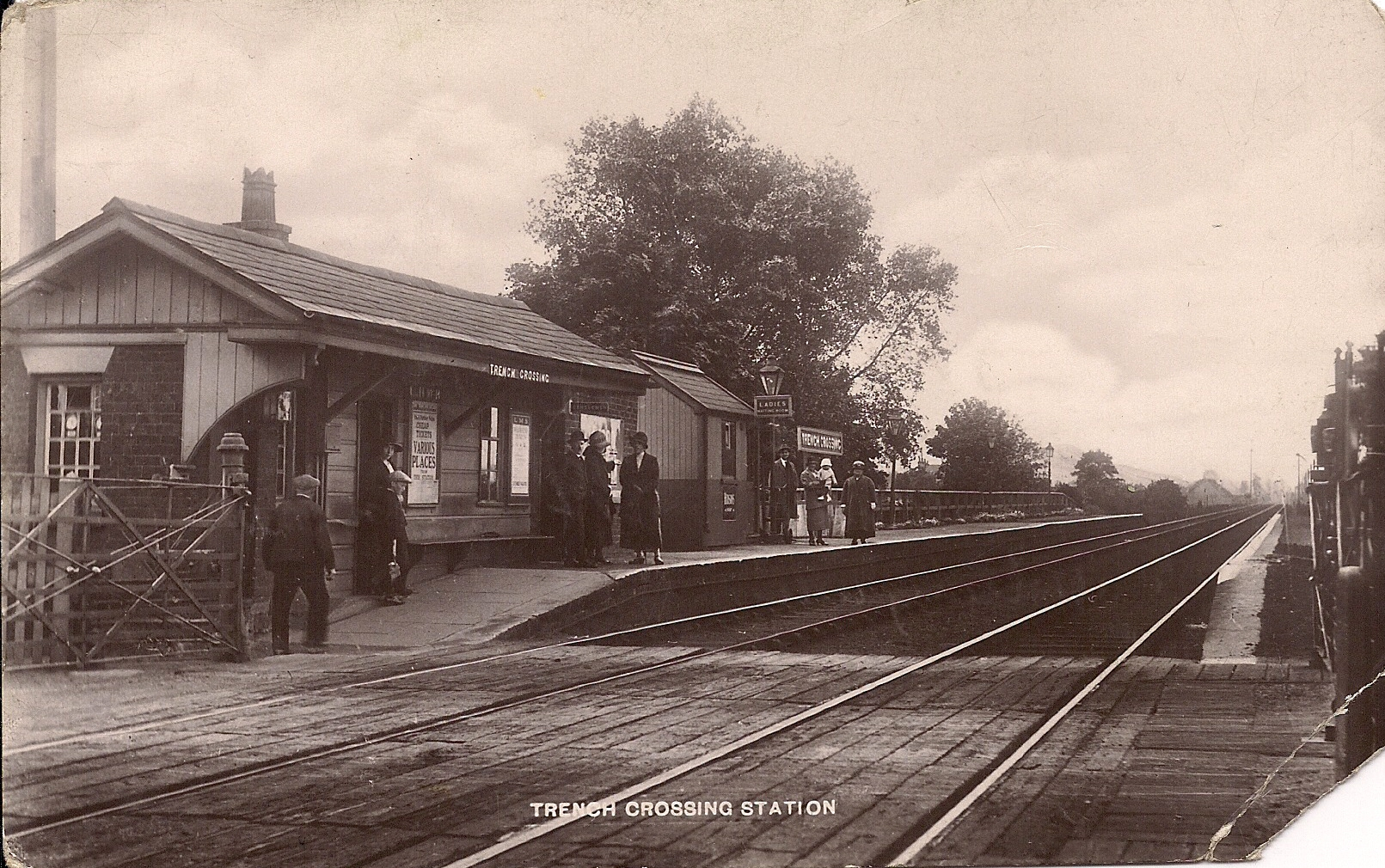
- A postcard view of Trench Crossing station from the 1920s

General information
- Location: Trench, Shropshire; England
- Coordinates: 52.7122°N 2.4646°W
- Grid reference: SJ687128
- Platforms: 2

Other information
- Status: Disused

History
- Original company: Shropshire Union Railways and Canal Company
- Pre-grouping: London and North Western Railway
- Post-grouping: London, Midland and Scottish Railway

Key dates
- Jan.1854: Opened
- 7 September 1964: Closed
Location

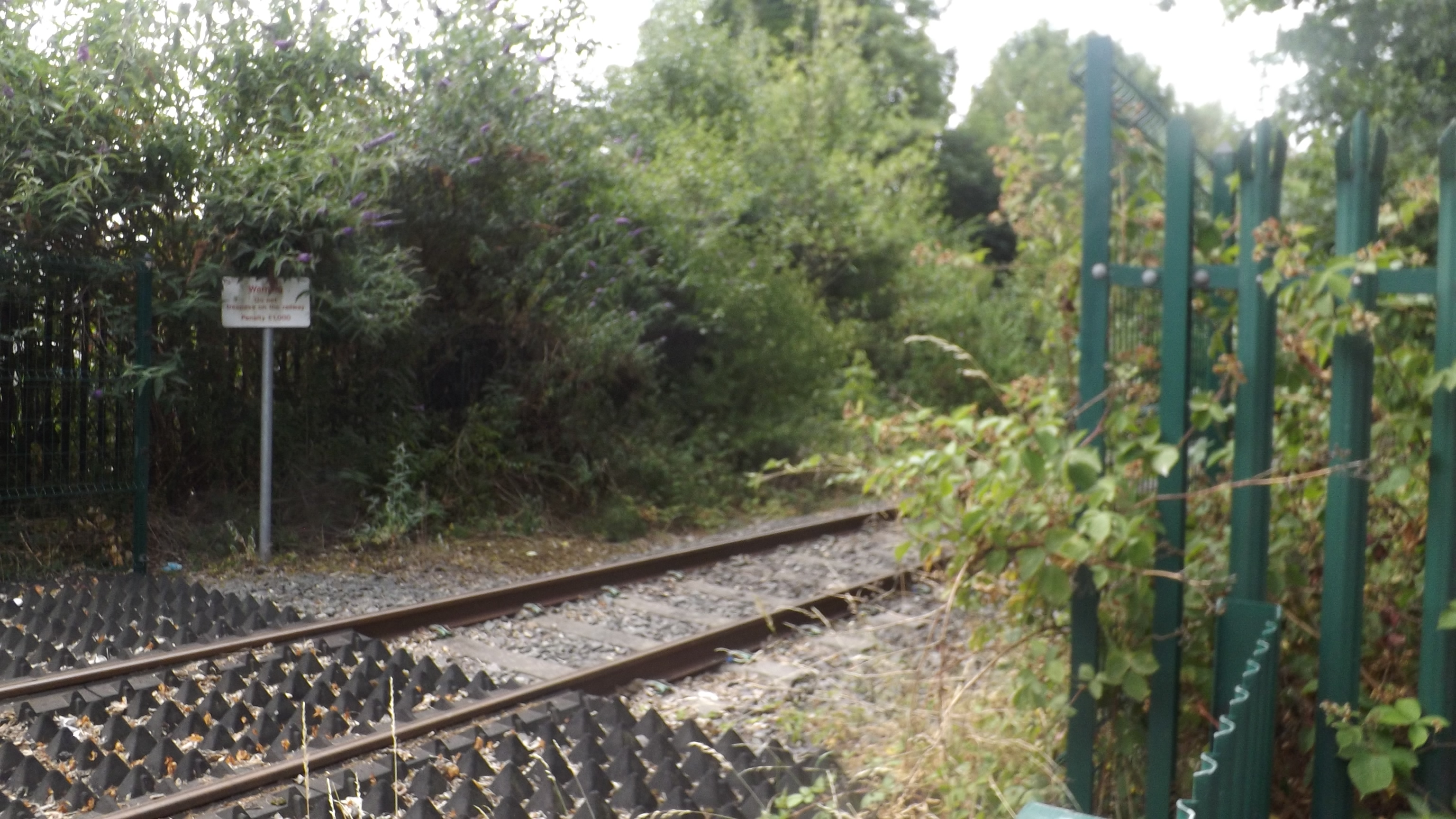

Trench Crossing railway station was a station in Trench, Shropshire, England. The station was opened in 1854 and closed in 1964.

The line was lifted following closure but was relaid in the late 2000s as a single track to serve the Telford International Freight Park at Donnington.

Preceding station	Disused railways	Following station
Hadley; Line open, station closed	London, Midland and Scottish Railway; Stafford–Shrewsbury line	Donnington; Line and station closed
