= Newport railway station (Shropshire) =

Disused railway station in Shropshire, England

Newport (Shropshire)
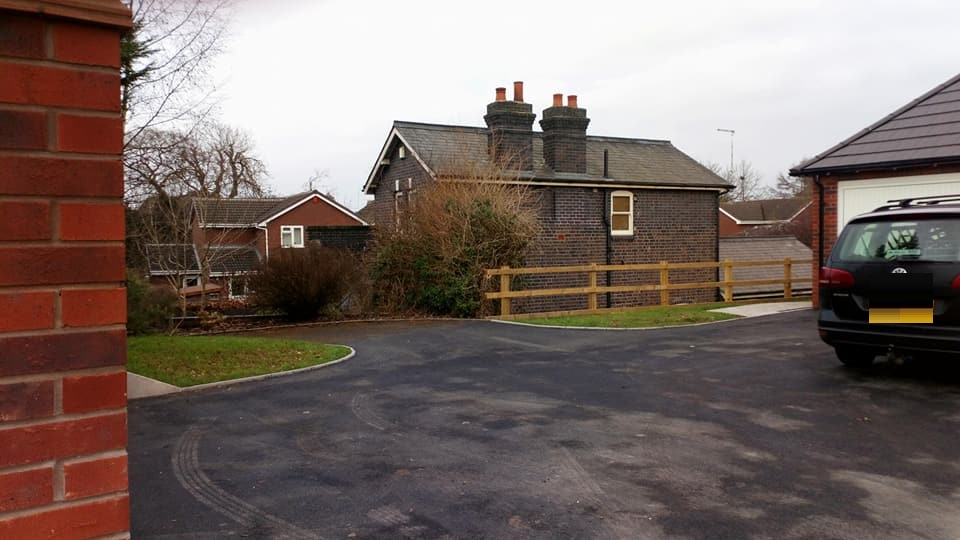
- Newport (Shropshire) station site in 2017

General information
- Location: Newport, Telford and Wrekin; England
- Coordinates: 52.7621°N 2.3709°W
- Grid reference: SJ750183
- Platforms: 2

Other information
- Status: Disused

History
- Original company: Shropshire Union Railways and Canal Company
- Pre-grouping: London and North Western Railway
- Post-grouping: London, Midland and Scottish Railway; London Midland Region of British Railways

Key dates
- 1 June 1849: Opened
- 7 Sept 1964: Closed for passengers
- 1967: Closed completely
Location

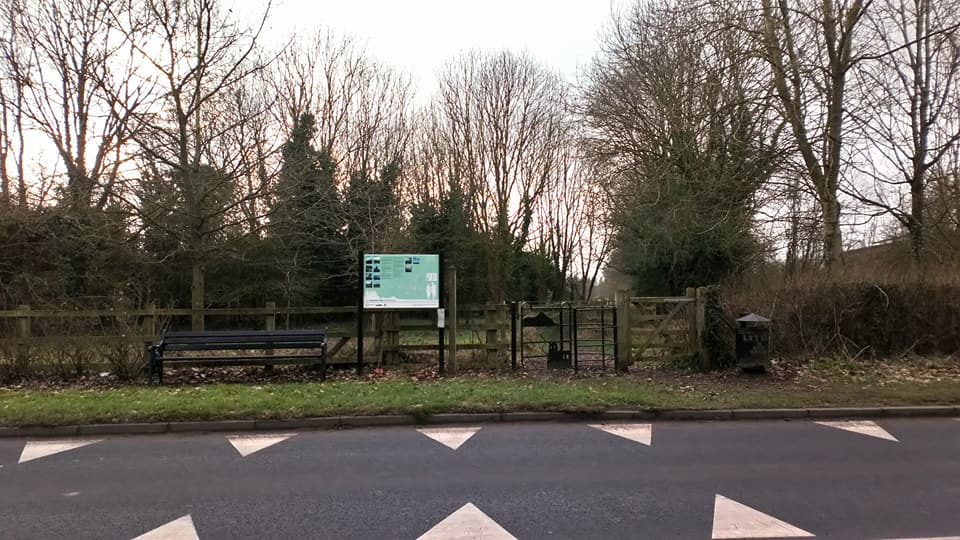
Position of the former road bridge that crossed the line

Newport (Shropshire) station was a railway station serving Newport in Shropshire. that was situated on the Stafford to Shrewsbury Line via Wellington.

== History ==
In 1847 the London and North Western Railway leased the line between Stafford and Wellington from the Shropshire Union Railways and Canal Company, however the line was not finished until 1849. Newport was an important station along the stretch between Wellington and Stafford as it had a large cattle market and was one of the largest towns in the area.

In 1922 the line was absorbed by the London, Midland and Scottish Railway, with the passenger service withdrawn in 1964 as a result of the Beeching Axe and the line closed completely in 1967. The track was lifted soon afterwards.

It has been reported by the Shropshire Star that Winston Churchill spent a night in the sidings at Newport in 1942, as did general Sir John Dill in 1941. and the Royal Train of George VI in 1948.

== Restoration ==
Due to Newport's proximity to the new town of Telford and the cities of Wolverhampton, Birmingham and Stoke-on-Trent, Newport is seen as a potential commuter town, but the absence of a station is a loss to the town. However, ever since the reinstatement of the line as far as Telford International Freight Park at Donnington, the reopening of Newport's station could "definitely be feasible", this would mean that freight that is currently routed through Wolverhampton to reach Scotland and the north, could benefit from a line through Newport to the West Coast Main Line at Stafford, thereby freeing up capacity from Telford to the West Midlands conurbation.

In 2009 the line was in the top 36 'Lines that should reopen' listing published by the Campaign for Better Transport.

| Preceding station | Disused railways | Following station |
|---|---|---|
| Donnington; Line and station closed | London, Midland and Scottish Railway; Stafford to Shrewsbury Line | Gnosall; Line and station closed |
