= Stafford rail crash =

There have been two rail crashes at Stafford in recent times:

- 8 March 1996
- August 1990

A few miles away, there was the Hixon rail crash on 6 January 1968.
