= Haughton railway station =

Disused railway station in Staffordshire, England

Haughton
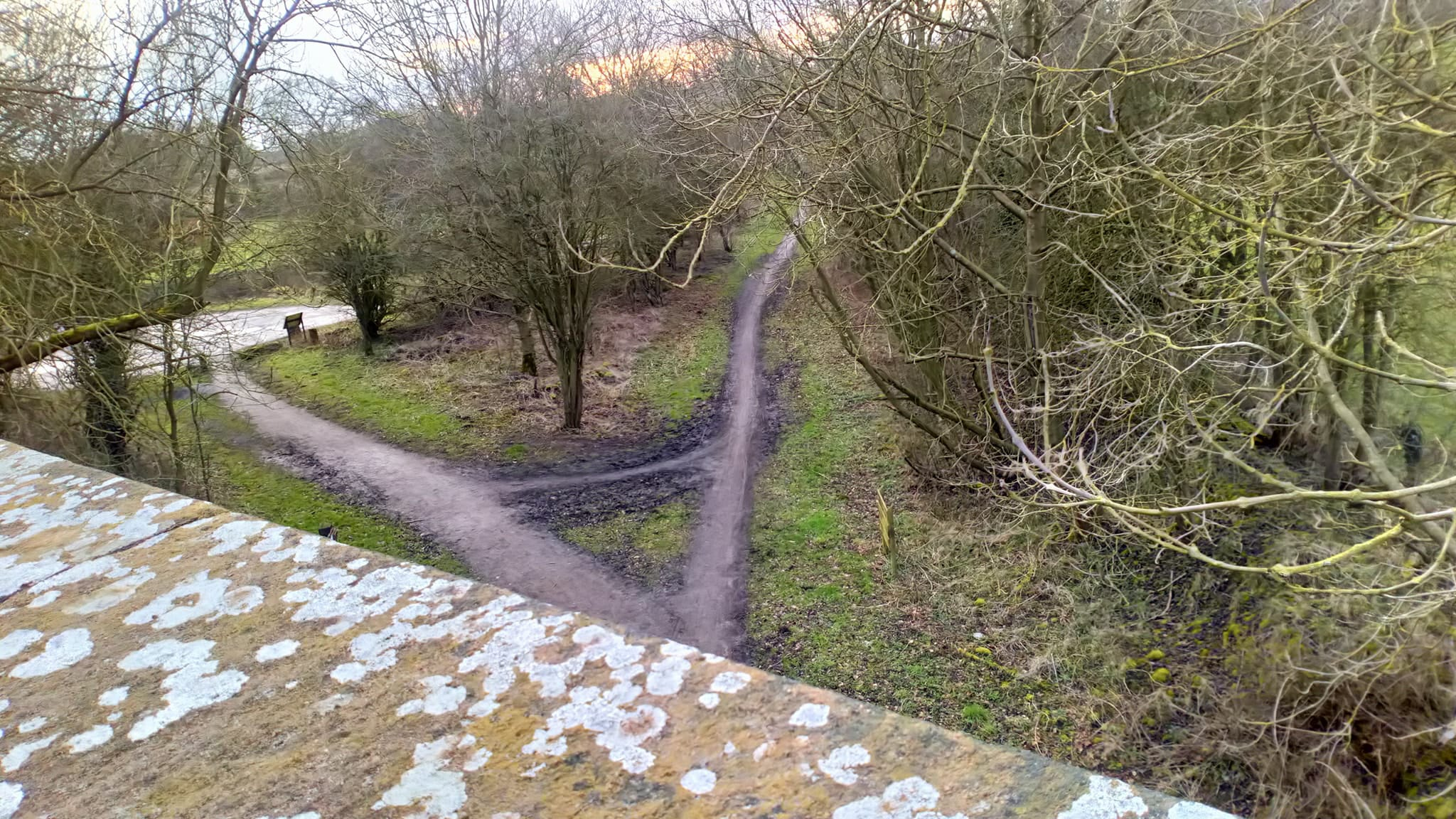
- Haughton station site in 2017

General information
- Location: Haughton, Staffordshire; England
- Coordinates: 52.7904°N 2.2047°W
- Grid reference: SJ863214
- Platforms: 2

Other information
- Status: Disused

History
- Original company: Shropshire Union Railways
- Pre-grouping: London and North Western Railway
- Post-grouping: London, Midland and Scottish Railway

Key dates
- 1 June 1849: Opened
- 23 May 1949: Closed
Location

Haughton railway station was a station in Haughton, Staffordshire, England. The station was opened on 1 June 1849 and closed in May 1949.

Preceding station	Disused railways	Following station
Gnosall; Line and station closed	London, Midland and Scottish Railway; Stafford–Shrewsbury line	Stafford; Line closed- station open
