= Gaff (surname) =

Gaff is a surname. Notable people with the surname include:

- Andrew Gaff (born 1992), Australian rules footballer
- Brent Gaff (born 1958), American baseball player
- Jerry G. Gaff (born 20th century), American educational scholar
- John Gaff (1927–2013), British Army officer
- Sheila Gaff (born 1989), German martial artist

== Other uses ==
- Thomas Gaff House (disambiguation)
