= Stafford railway station =

Railway station in Staffordshire, England

Stafford
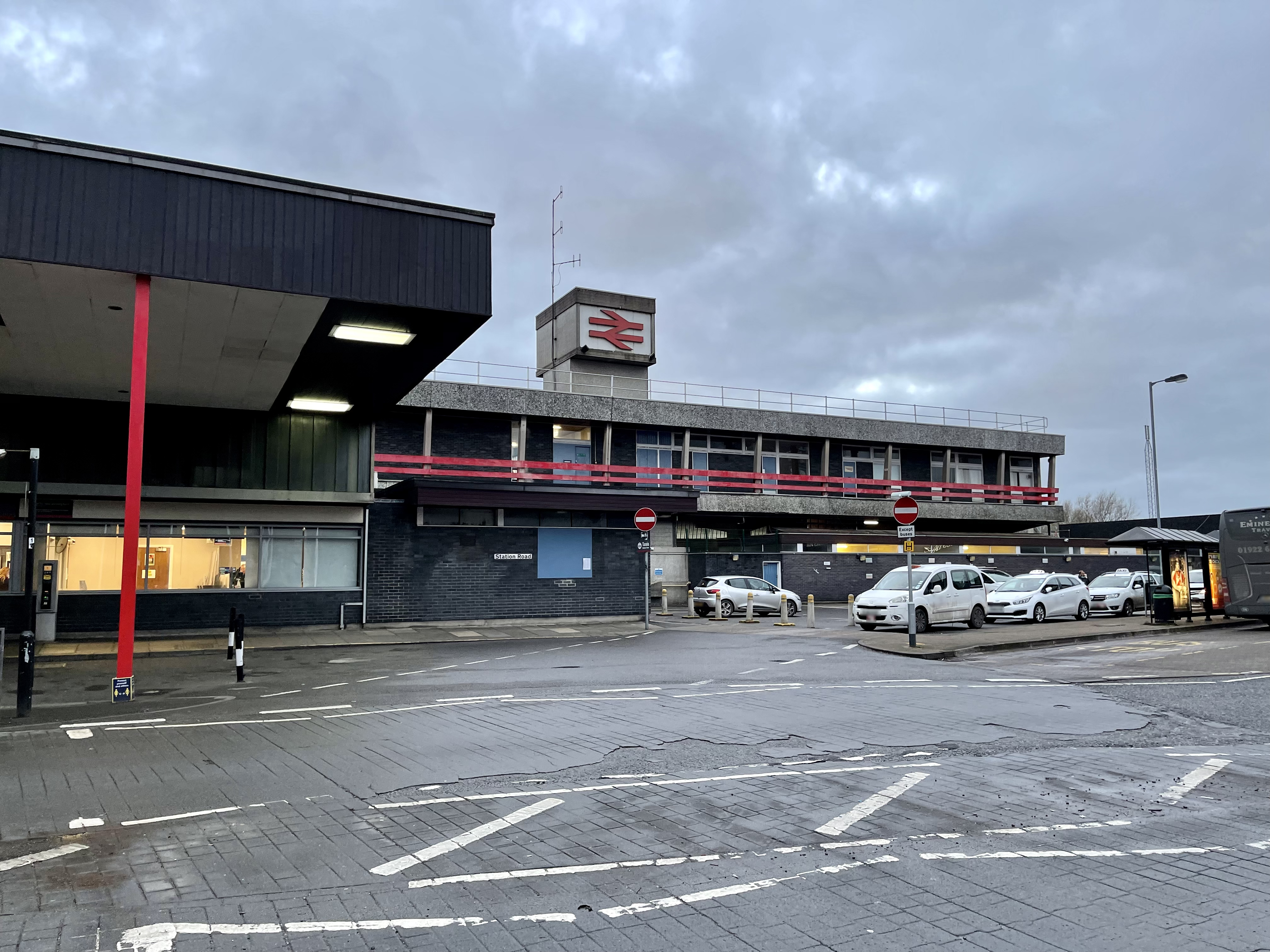
- Station frontage in 2022.

General information
- Location: Stafford, Borough of Stafford; England
- Coordinates: 52.8036°N 2.1231°W
- OS Grid ref: SJ 918 229
- Manager: Avanti West Coast
- Platforms: 6
- Tracks: 7

Other information
- Station code: STA
- Classification: DfT category C1

History
- Original company: Grand Junction Railway
- Pre-grouping: London and North Western Railway
- Post-grouping: London, Midland and Scottish Railway

Key dates
- 4 July 1837: Station opened
- 1844: Rebuilt
- 1862: Rebuilt
- 1962: Current building opened

Passengers
- 2021/22: ▲1.811 million
- Interchange: ▲0.212 million
- 2022/23: ▼1.639 million
- Interchange: ▲0.338 million
- 2023/24: ▲2.029 million
- Interchange: ▲0.569 million
- 2024/25: ▲2.457 million
- Interchange: ▼0.533 million
- 2025/26: ▲2.772 million
- Interchange: 0.533 million
Location
Notes
- Passenger statistics from the Office of Rail and Road

Stafford is a major interchange railway station in Stafford, Staffordshire, England; it is the second busiest in the county, after Stoke-on-Trent. It serves the market and county town, as well as surrounding villages. The station lies on the junction of the Trent Valley line, the Rugby–Birmingham–Stafford line (Birmingham Loop) and the West Coast Main Line; it was also the terminus for the former Stafford–Uttoxeter and Stafford–Shrewsbury lines.

The current brutalist station building was built in 1962 and is the fourth to have existed on this site. The interior of the station was refurbished in 2015, which allowed it to have a new WHSmith store and an improved ticket office.

== History ==
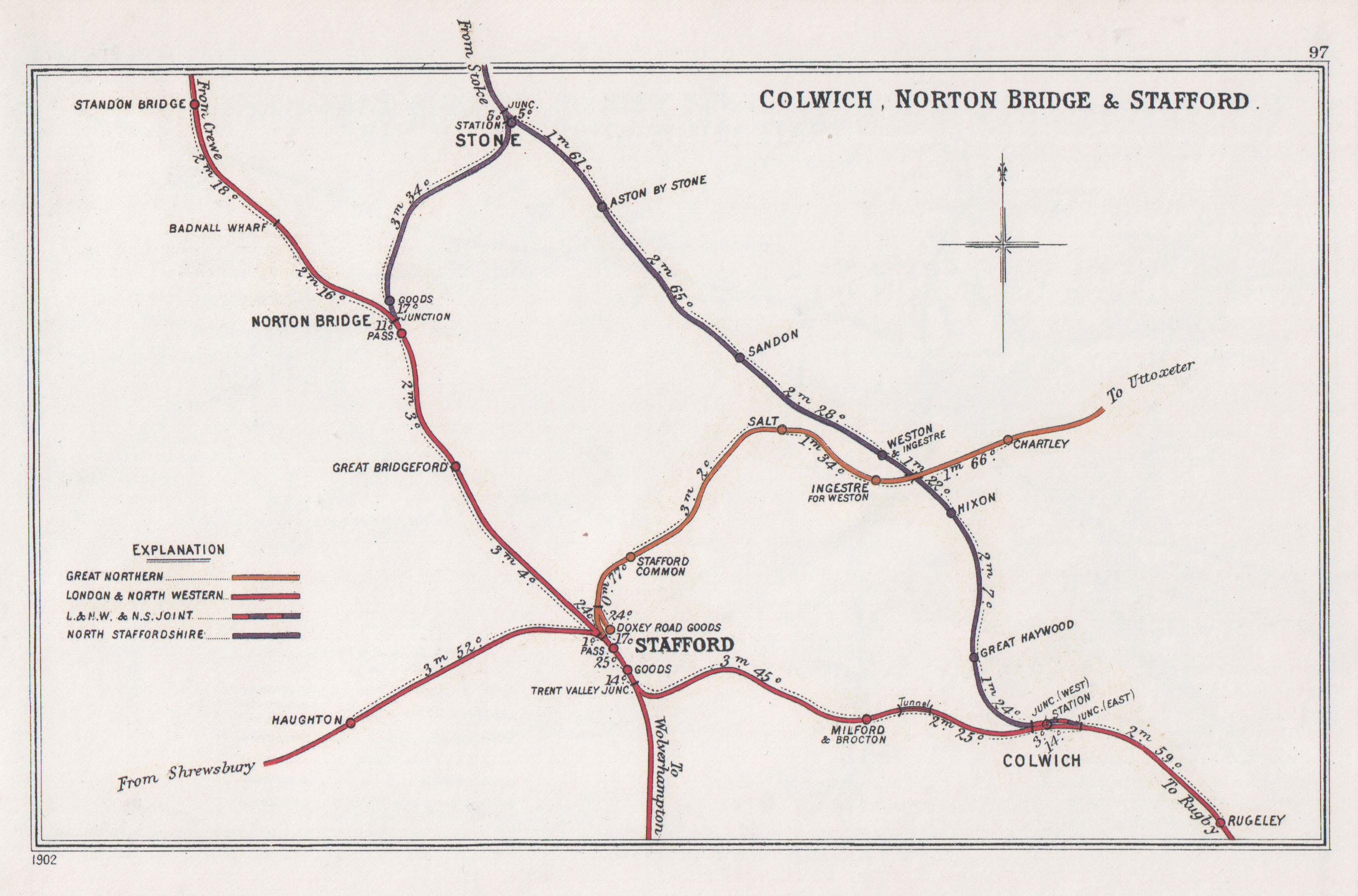
A 1902 Railway Clearing House diagram of railway junctions around Stafford

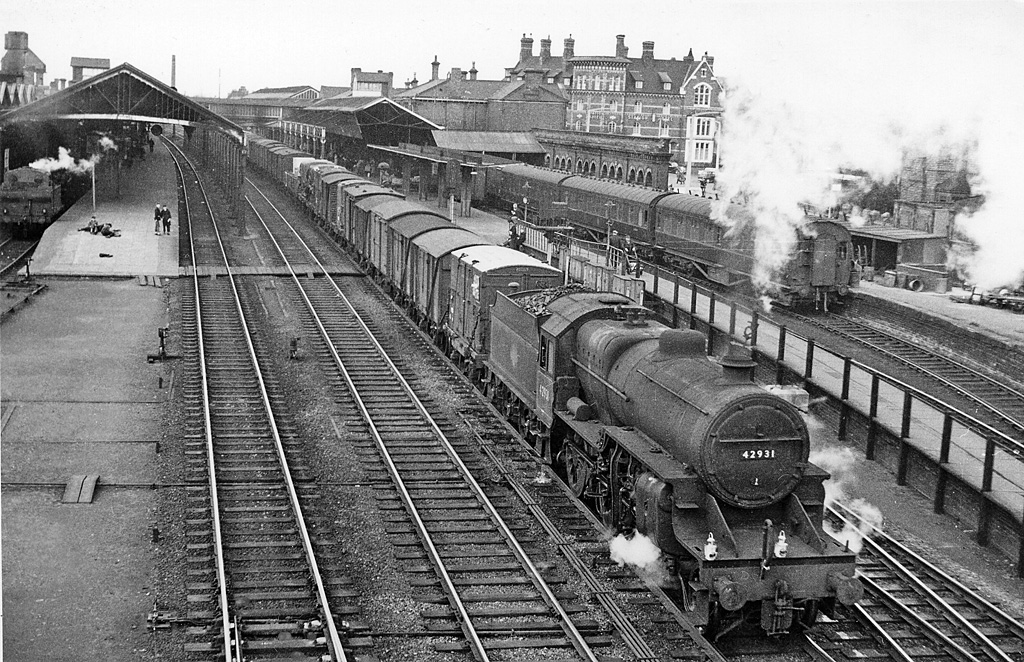
The station in 1960

The first station was built by the Grand Junction Railway and opened in July 1837 on the north side of Newport Road. This soon proved to be inadequate and was replaced in 1844 with a second station, designed by John Cunningham in an Elizabethan style. The station was rebuilt again on a larger scale in 1862, on a site to the north of the older ones, designed by the London and North Western Railway company architect WIlliam Baker in an Italian style. In 1866, a direct approach from the town centre was built, and the North Western Hotel (later the Station Hotel) was built opposite the station; this was demolished in 1972.

The current Brutalist station was built in 1962, by the architect William Robert Headley, as part of the modernisation programme which saw the electrification of the West Coast Main Line.

Lines originally built by the Stafford and Uttoxeter Railway and the Shropshire Union Railways and Canal Company (to Shrewsbury) also used the station. The Stafford to Uttoxeter line closed to passenger traffic in 1939, with the Shrewsbury line closing as part of the Beeching Axe in 1964.

Following the rebuilding of the station between 1961 and 1962, Isabel, a narrow gauge engine built by local firm WG Bagnall, stood on a plinth on the opposite side of Station Road, at the junction of Railway Street. It was removed in the mid-1980s and is now on the Amerton Railway.

=== Incidents and accidents ===
Two accidents have happened at Stafford since 1990:

- On 4 August 1990, an out-of-service train heading to a depot in Birmingham crashed into the back of an express train bound for Penzance on platform 4. The driver was killed and 36 people were injured.
- On 8 March 1996, a mail train collided with a freight train carrying liquid carbon dioxide just south of Stafford. A mail sorter was killed and another 22 people were injured. The mail train's Class 86 locomotive was catapulted up the embankment and came to rest against a house.

== Layout ==
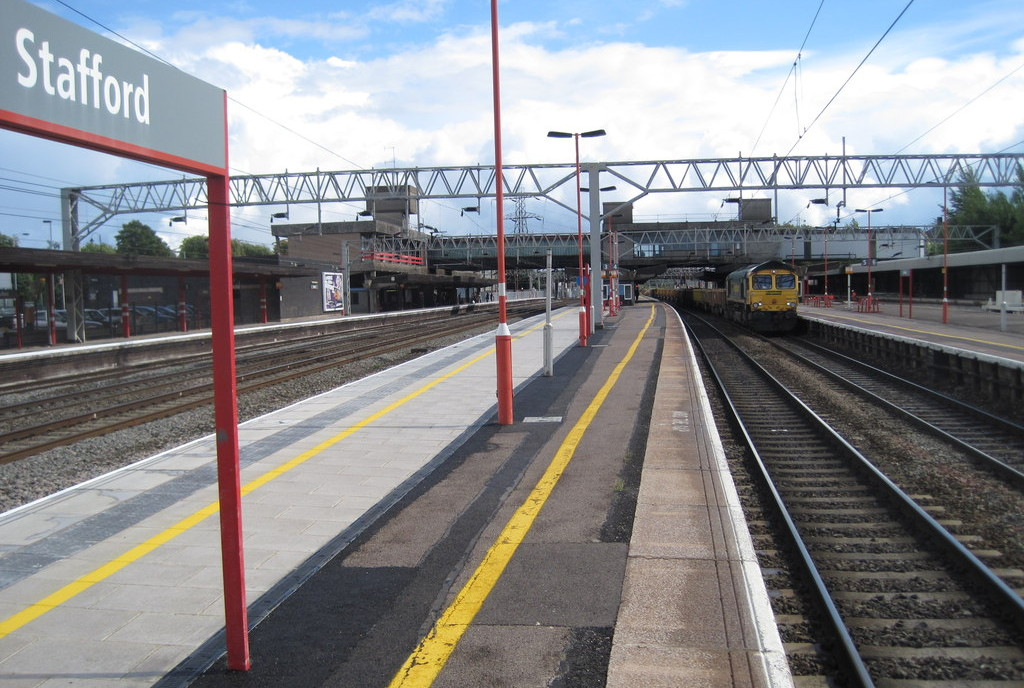
Stafford station, looking south from the end of platforms 3 and 4

There are five platforms in use at the station, all of which are accessible from either of the main lines that converge from the south; these are:

- Platform 1 is usually used for services to London Euston
- Platform 3 for Avanti northbound services via Crewe from the Trent Valley Line.
- Platform 4 is usually used for trains towards Birmingham New Street and the West of England.
- Platform 5 is usually used for CrossCountry services towards Manchester Piccadilly, London Northwestern Railway services towards Liverpool Lime Street and Avanti services to Preston extending to Blackpool or Scotland.
- Platform 6 is usually used for trains starting/terminating towards/from London Euston, Birmingham New Street, Northampton, Stoke-on-Trent, Crewe and Liverpool Lime Street.

The Stafford Area Improvements Programme improved the track layout around the station, so that trains are no longer bound to a platform based upon direction of travel; trains can now use any platform, regardless of direction.

Platform 6 used to be the terminus of the Chase Line, however it now terminates at Rugeley Trent Valley. The platform is also sometimes used for railtours, hence why the platform is split into 'a' and 'b' sections.

The former bay platform 2 is no longer used by passenger trains. When Virgin Trains operated the InterCity West Coast franchise, platform 2 served as a stable for their Class 57 rescue locomotives; this role is now redundant. Occasionally, the bay platform stables other locomotives from freight operators.

The westernmost platform, unofficially known as platform 7, was formerly used by Royal Mail to load mail from the sorting office next door to the platform. This practice has since ended and now the westernmost platform has been converted into a single goods line, with bi-directional operation. This was completed during the bank holiday weekend of 29–31 August 2015.

In October 2012, Network Rail began refurbishment works at the station due to the poor condition of some of the structures. The work included resurfacing the platforms (platforms 1 and 3 had been completed before the works), improving surface and roof drainage, renewing the opaque glazing on the footbridge, installing new canopy roof covers on the platforms and some structural work on the platform supports.

== Stafford Area Improvements Programme ==
The Stafford Area Improvements Programme by Network Rail aims to allow more trains to run and also aims to reduce journey times by removing key bottlenecks in the area around Stafford.

The programme included large scale building works, north of the station in Norton Bridge, where a flyover was constructed to allow faster train services and remove the need to slow down before entering the junction.

Other benefits of the programme were the introduction of bi-directional signals, which meant that trains can now use any platform, regardless of direction of travel.

=== Stafford resignalling ===
The resignalling aspect of the programme was completed over the bank holiday weekend of 29–31 August 2015. All platforms now have bi-directional signalling, and the goods loop is now operational.

The resignalling programme meant that Stafford signal boxes would be closed and trains would be controlled from the Rugby Rail Operating Centre (ROC). The last train was signalled from Stafford in the early hours of 29 August 2015 and the first train was signalled from Rugby ROC on the morning of 1 September 2015.

== Facilities ==
Currently, the station has many facilities which are typical of those across the Avanti West Coast Network; these include a ticket office, toilets, a car park (with 75 spaces), a coffee shop and a newsagent.

In June 2015, Virgin Trains unveiled £1 million plans to refurbish the entrance, ticket hall and foyer. The work started in November in the same year and was anticipated to be completed within 20 weeks; these were completed March 2016. The changes saw the number of ticket machines at the station double, WHSmith relocation of the travel centre to the current ticket purchasing area and Starbucks took the place of Pumpkin Café Shop. The cafe was also shortened to allow an increased size of the waiting area.

== Services ==
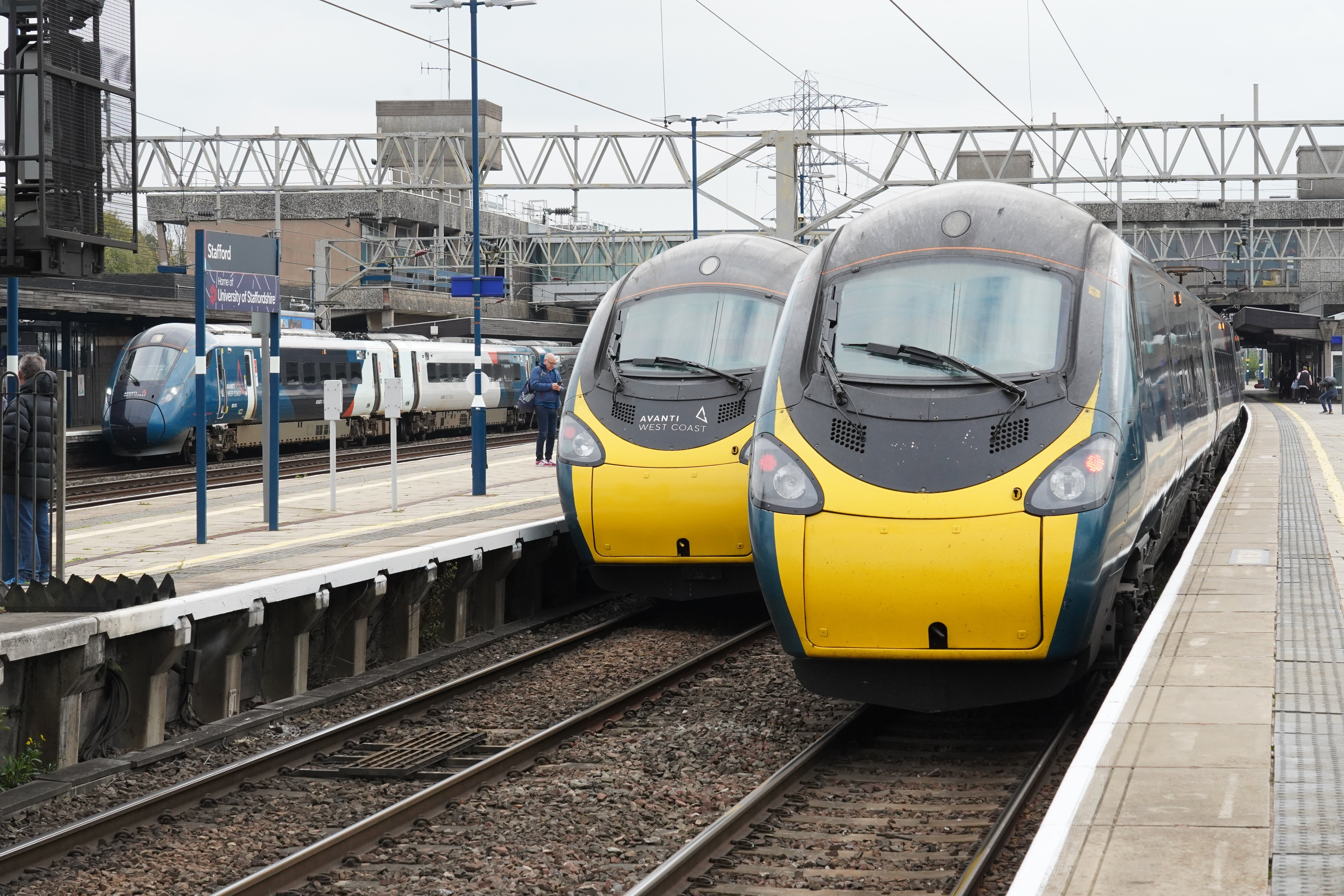
Avanti West Coast services calling at Stafford, 2025

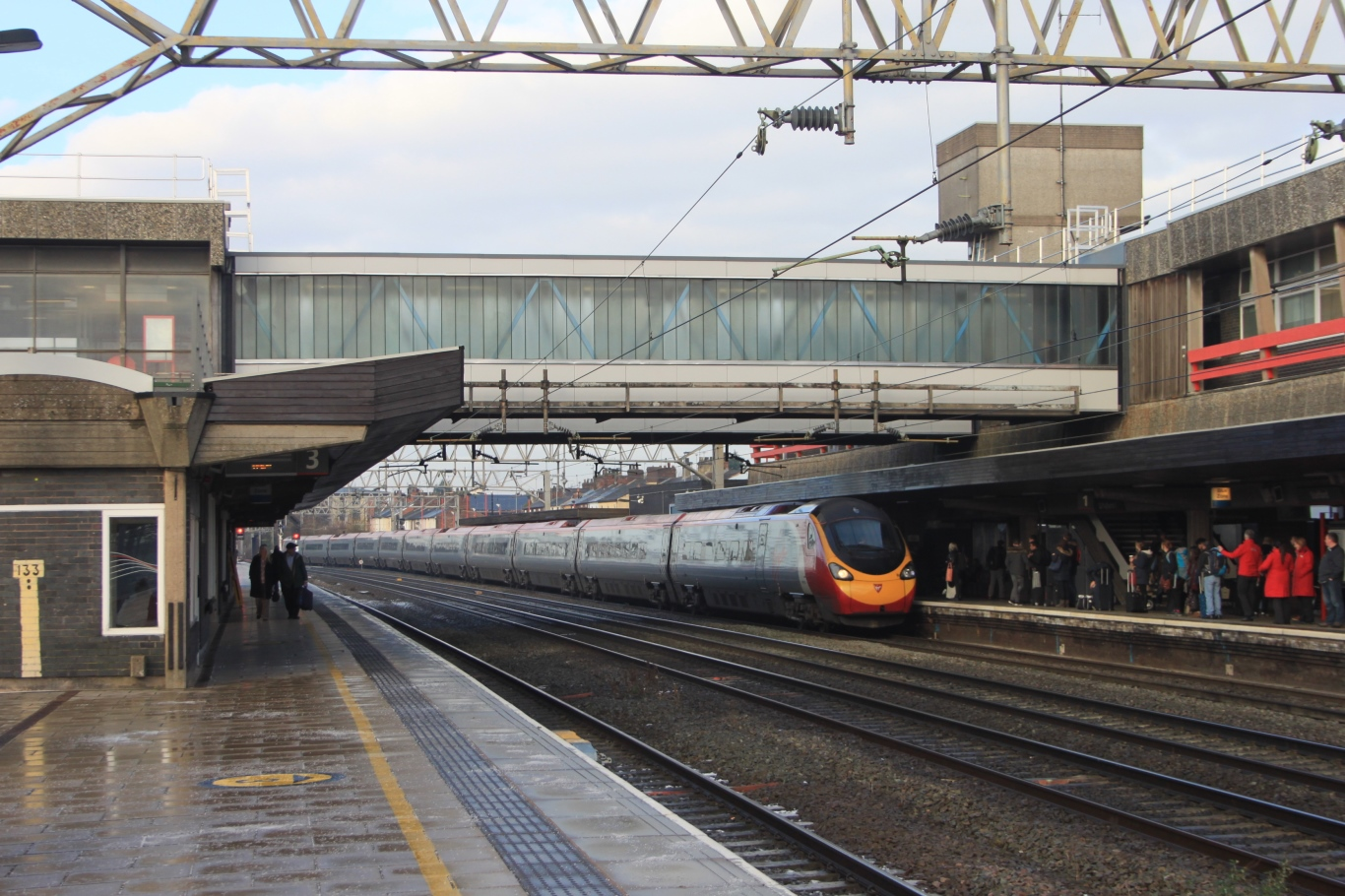
A southbound Virgin Trains express calling at Stafford, 2014. These trains are now operated by Avanti West Coast.

From the south, two branches of the West Coast Main Line meet here: the Trent Valley and the Birmingham Loop lines. To the north, the trunk of the line continues towards Crewe, whilst the Manchester branch goes on to Stoke-on-Trent.

The station is currently served by three train operating companies, with general off-peak services as follows (in trains per hour/day):

Avanti West Coast

- 1 train per hour (tph) to Manchester Piccadilly, via Crewe
- 1 train every 2 hours to Edinburgh Waverley, via Crewe
- 1 train every 2 hours to Glasgow Central, via Crewe
- 1 tph to Holyhead, via Crewe
- 2 tph to London Euston only
- 1 tph to London Euston, via Birmingham New Street

CrossCountry

- 2 tph to Manchester Piccadilly, via Stoke-on-Trent
- 1 tph to Bournemouth, via Birmingham New Street
- 1 tph to Bristol Temple Meads, via Birmingham New Street

London Northwestern Railway

- 2 tph to Liverpool Lime Street, via Crewe
- 1 tph to Crewe via Stoke-on-Trent
- 2 tph to Birmingham New Street, via Wolverhampton
- 1 tph to London Euston, via Nuneaton.

Preceding station	National Rail	Following station
Wolverhampton	CrossCountry South West – Manchester	Stoke-on-Trent
Wolverhampton	CrossCountry South West – Manchester	Crewe
Crewe Terminus	London Northwestern Railway London–Crewe	Rugeley Trent Valley towards London Euston
Crewe towards Liverpool Lime Street	London Northwestern Railway Birmingham–Liverpool	Penkridge towards Birmingham New Street
Stone towards Crewe	London Northwestern Railway Stafford–Crewe	Terminus
London Euston	Avanti West Coast London – Manchester	Crewe
Milton Keynes Central	Avanti West Coast London – Manchester	Crewe
Lichfield Trent Valley	Avanti West Coast London – Manchester	Crewe
Nuneaton	Avanti West Coast London – Manchester	Crewe
Wolverhampton	Avanti West Coast London – Birmingham – Edinburgh/Glasgow/Blackpool	Crewe
London Euston	Avanti West Coast London – Chester – North Wales	Crewe
Lichfield Trent Valley	Avanti West Coast London – Chester – North Wales	Crewe
Wolverhampton	Avanti West Coast London – Chester – North Wales	Crewe
Milton Keynes Central	Avanti West Coast London – Liverpool	Crewe
Rugby	Avanti West Coast London – Liverpool	Crewe
Lichfield Trent Valley	Avanti West Coast London – Liverpool	Crewe
Nuneaton	Avanti West Coast London – Liverpool	Runcorn
Wolverhampton	Avanti West Coast London – Stoke – Crewe	Stoke-on-Trent
Nuneaton	Avanti West Coast London – Preston/Blackpool North	Crewe
Lichfield Trent Valley	Avanti West Coast London – Preston/Blackpool North	Crewe
Disused railways
Terminus	Great Northern Railway Stafford and Uttoxeter Railway	Stafford Common
Terminus	London and North Western Railway Shropshire Union Railways	Haughton

=== Future services ===
There have been proposals to reintroduce services to terminate on the Chase Line, which was cutback to Rugeley Trent Valley in 2008, as well a significant increase in the frequency of local services under Midlands Rail Hub.

== Cultural references ==
=== In fiction ===
The station appears as a location in the 1978 sitcom Going Straight, starring Ronnie Barker. In the episode 'Going Home', it's the scene of two robbers who boarded the train in order to escape, and who run into Ronnie Barker's character.
