= GAF =

GAF or Gaf may refer to:

== Military ==
- General of the Air Force, US
- Ghana Armed Forces
- Guardia alla Frontiera, Italy

== Other uses ==
- Gāf (Persian letter), a Perso-Arabic letter
- Gaf (Mandaeism), a demon of the Mandaean underworld
- GAF Materials Corporation, an American manufacturer
  - General Aniline & Film, its predecessor
- Gafsa – Ksar International Airport, in Tunisia
- Gende language
- Global Assessment of Functioning
- Government Aircraft Factories, in Australia
- NeoGAF, formerly Gaming-Age Forums, online video-game forum
- Great American Family, a television network
  - Great American Faith & Living, its sister network

== See also ==
- Gaff (disambiguation)
