= Gnosall railway station =

Disused railway station in Staffordshire, England

Gnosall
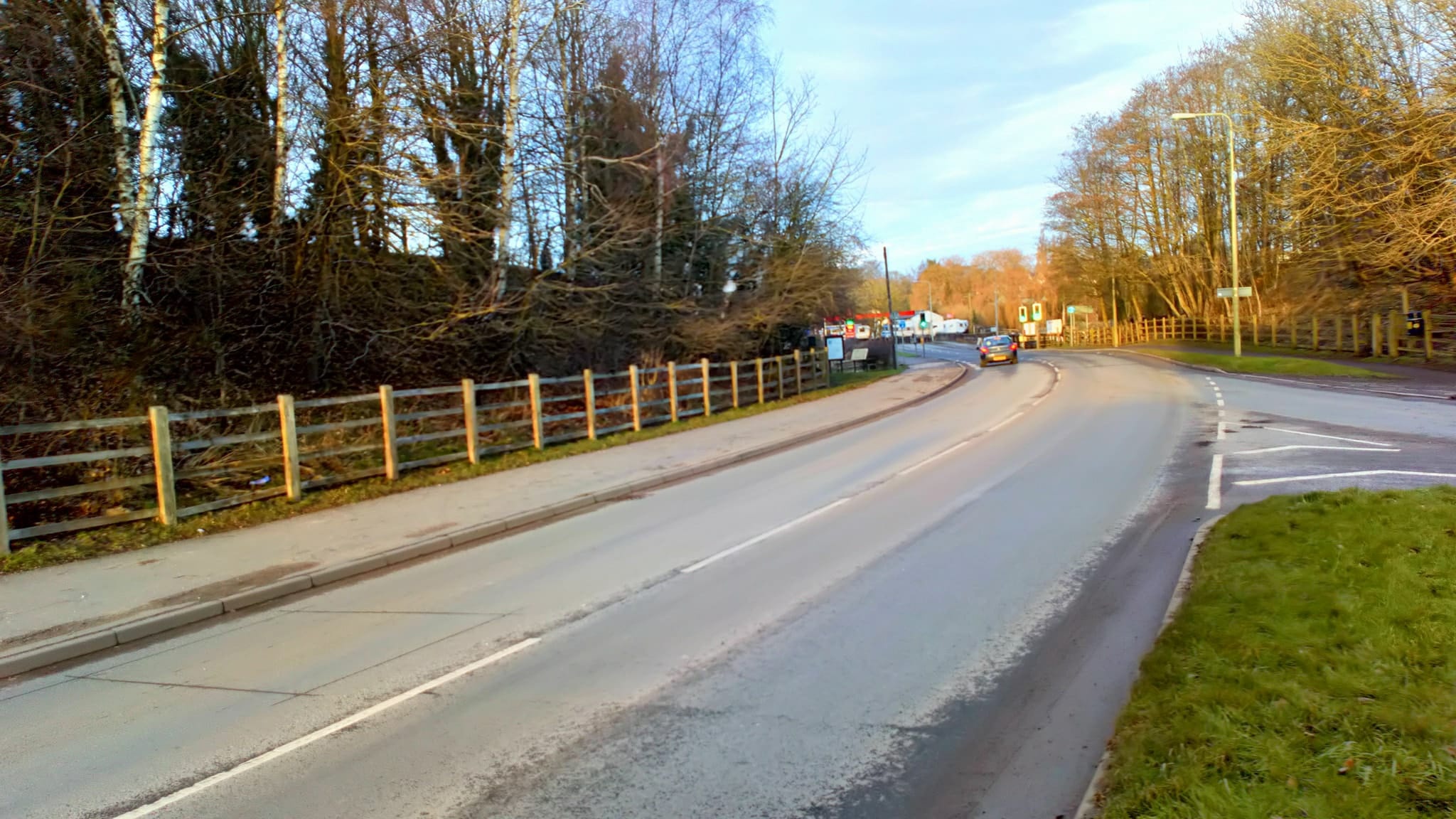
- Gnosall station site in 2017

General information
- Location: Gnosall, Staffordshire; England
- Coordinates: 52.7818°N 2.2560°W
- Grid reference: SJ828205
- Platforms: 2

Other information
- Status: Disused

History
- Original company: Shropshire Union Railways
- Pre-grouping: London and North Western Railway
- Post-grouping: London, Midland and Scottish Railway

Key dates
- 1 June 1849: Opened
- 7 September 1964: Closed
Location

Gnosall railway station was a station in Gnosall, Staffordshire, England. The station was opened in June 1849 and closed on 7 September 1964.

Preceding station	Disused railways	Following station
Newport; Line and station closed	London, Midland and Scottish Railway; Stafford–Shrewsbury line	Haughton; Line and station closed
