= Gaff =

Gaff may refer to:

== Ankle-worn devices ==
- Spurs in variations of cockfighting
- Climbing spikes used to ascend wood poles, such as utility poles

== Arts and entertainment ==
- A character in the Blade Runner film franchise
- Penny gaff, a 19th-century English variety show
- A magician's trick prop, such as a fake sword, used to imitate sword swallowing
- A character in the Eon Kid animated series

== Pole-shaped devices ==
- Fishing gaff, a pole used in fishing
- Gaff rig, a fore-and-aft sailing arrangement in which the sail is held up by a spar called a gaff
- Hakapik, or gaff, used as a seal-hunting weapon

== Other uses ==
- Operation Gaff, 1944 military mission of assassination
- Gaff (clothing), an item worn as means of concealing genitalia
- Gaff (surname), for people with the surname
- GAFF or "generalized AMBER force field", a set of parameters used in simulating the interactions of small organic molecules

== See also ==
- Gaf, an Arabic letter
- Gaffe, an embarrassing error
- Gaffer tape or gaff tape, a form of sticky tape
- Gaffer (disambiguation)
