= Donnington railway station =

Disused railway station in Shropshire, England

Donnington
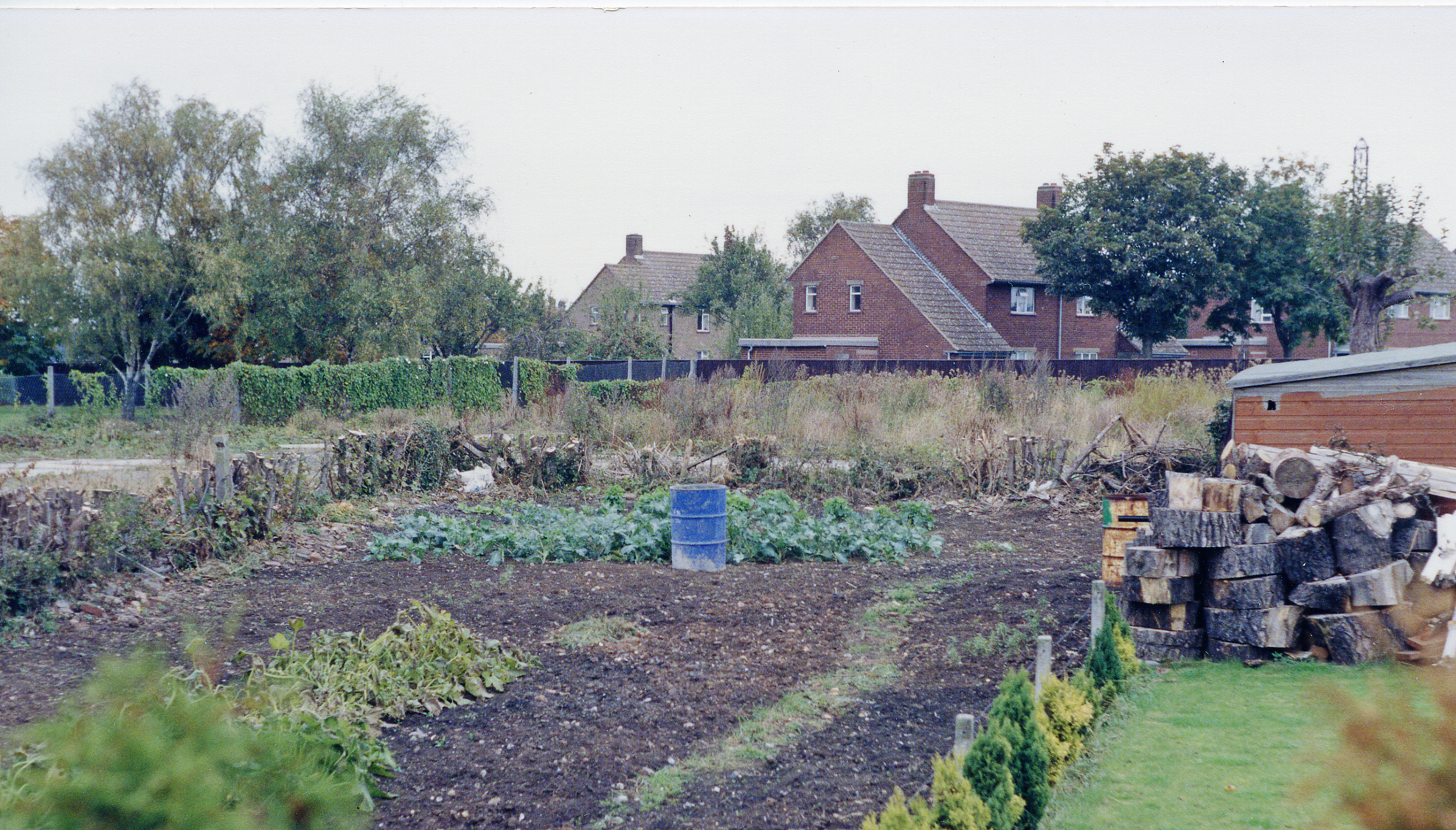
- Site of the station in 1991

General information
- Location: Donnington, Telford; England
- Coordinates: 52.7256°N 2.4348°W
- Grid reference: SJ708143
- Platforms: 2

Other information
- Status: Disused

History
- Original company: Shropshire Union Railways and Canal Company
- Pre-grouping: London and North Western Railway
- Post-grouping: London, Midland and Scottish Railway

Key dates
- 1 June 1849: Opened
- 1 January 1871: Renamed Donnington Wood
- July 1871: Renamed Donnington
- 7 September 1964: Closed
Location

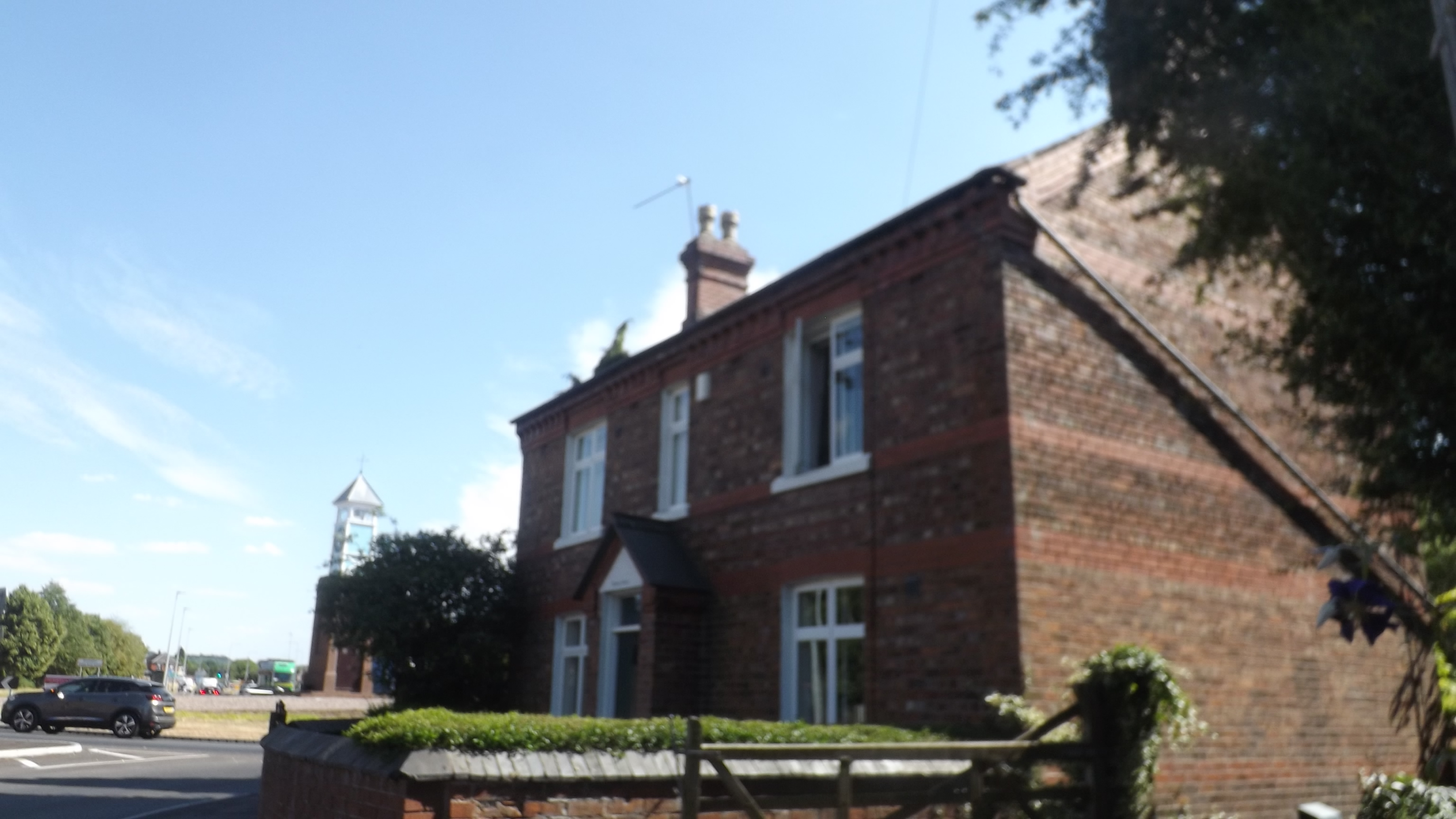
Former station house near Donnington

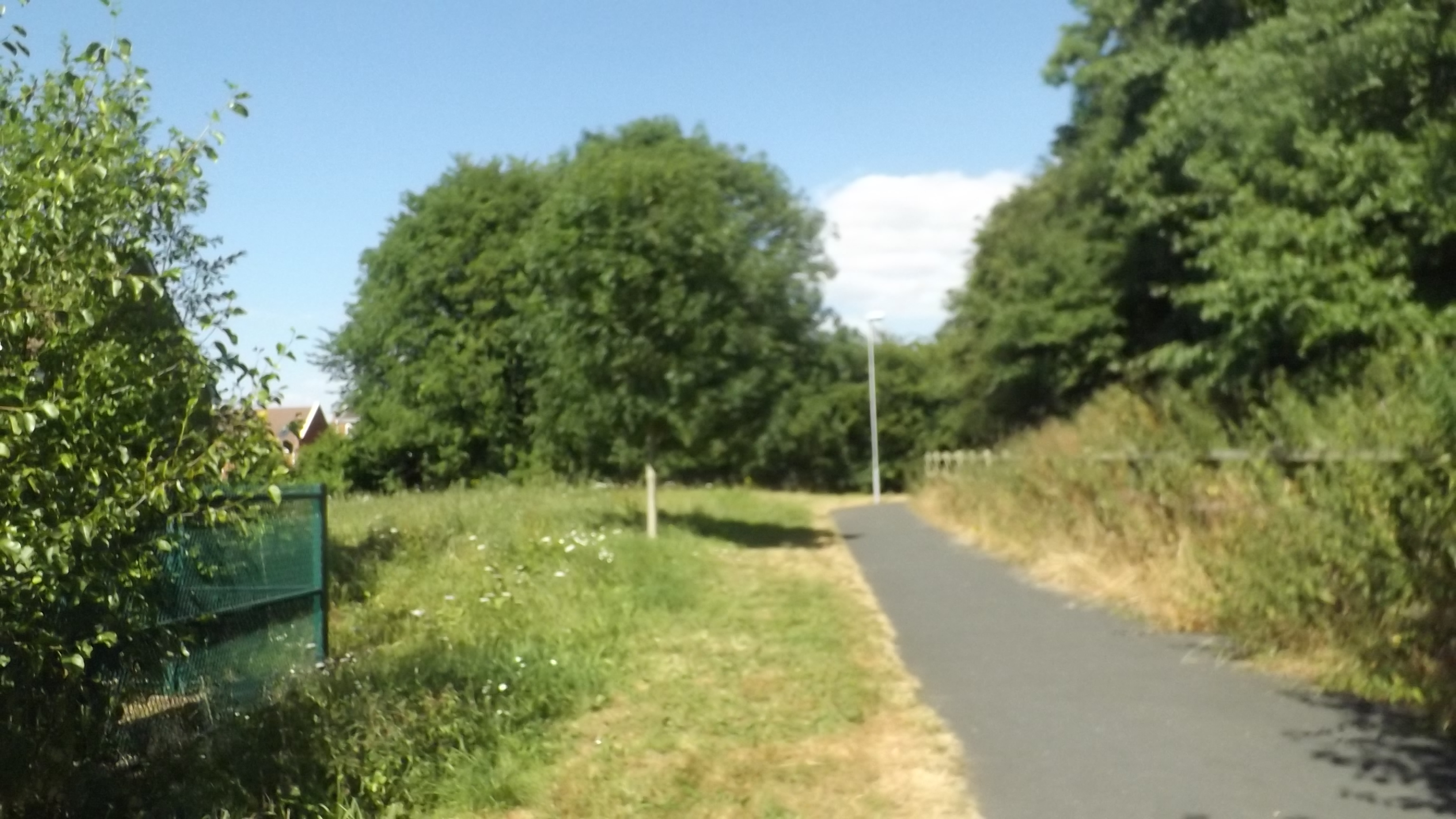
Site of Donnington railway station in 2018

Donnington railway station was a railway station in Shropshire, England. It was built by the Shropshire Union Railway who opened it in 1849, Passenger service ceased in September 1964, and freight service ceased on 4 October 1965.

Preceding station	Disused railways	Following station
Trench Crossing; Line and station closed	London, Midland and Scottish Railway; Stafford–Shrewsbury line	Newport; Line and station closed
