= John Gaff =

British Army officer (1927–2013)

John Maurice Gaff GM (27 May 1927 – 28 November 2013) was a British Army officer who was the senior bomb disposal expert during his service in Northern Ireland in the mid 1970s. He was awarded the George Medal for his personal courage during bomb disposal operations. He was president of the Gallantry Medallists League from 2002 to 2008.

Gaff was born at Guildford, Surrey and educated at the Royal Grammar School, Guildford. He joined the British Army in 1944 and was commissioned into the Queen's Royal Regiment in 1946 and served with the regiment in Palestine.

Gaff married Christine Brown in 1950 with whom he had one daughter and two sons.

== Career ==
Gaff transferred to the Parachute Regiment and joined the 9th Parachute Battalion and became the battalion's weapons training officer. He left Palestine in 1948. He was posted to Netheravon where he assisted with parachute trials with new aircraft, and was then posted to RAF Cardington where he was a parachute training officer.

Gaff later received a regular commission in the RAOC and qualified as an Inspecting Ordnance Officer. He served at a base ammunition depot at Singapore during the Malayan Emergency. He was posted to the Central Ordnance Depot, Donnington, as Guided Weapons Liaison Officer, in 1957. Gaff was promoted to Major in May 1961. He served in West Berlin and BAOR.

Gaff was posted to Northern Ireland in 1974 as Chief Ammunition Technical Officer and was the Explosives Ordnance Disposal adviser to the GOC Northern Ireland. He had overall command of all bomb disposal units in Northern Ireland.

On 21 March 1974, Gaff led the operation to defuse bombs at a railway signal box and on the railway track at Dunloy Halt, near Ballymoney, County Antrim, which involved nearly 15 hours of very hazardous work. His citation for the award of the George Medal included the following: " for the outstanding personal courage and devotion to duty which he demonstrated throughout his tour of Northern Ireland in an extremely hazardous and highly technical field of operations. "

The BBC documentary The Bomb Disposal Men was filmed in 1974 during his service in Northern Ireland.

== Later life ==
Gaff retired from the Army in May 1975 and set up a consultancy business for bomb disposal, working in Africa, the Middle East and Far East until 1998 when he sold the business. He assisted the writer of espionage novels John le Carré on subjects within his expertise.

Gaff was president of the Gallantry Medallists League from 2002 to 2008.
