= 1990 Stafford rail crash =

Railway accident in Staffordshire, England

Coordinates: 52°48′12″N 2°7′21″W

1990 Stafford Rail Crash
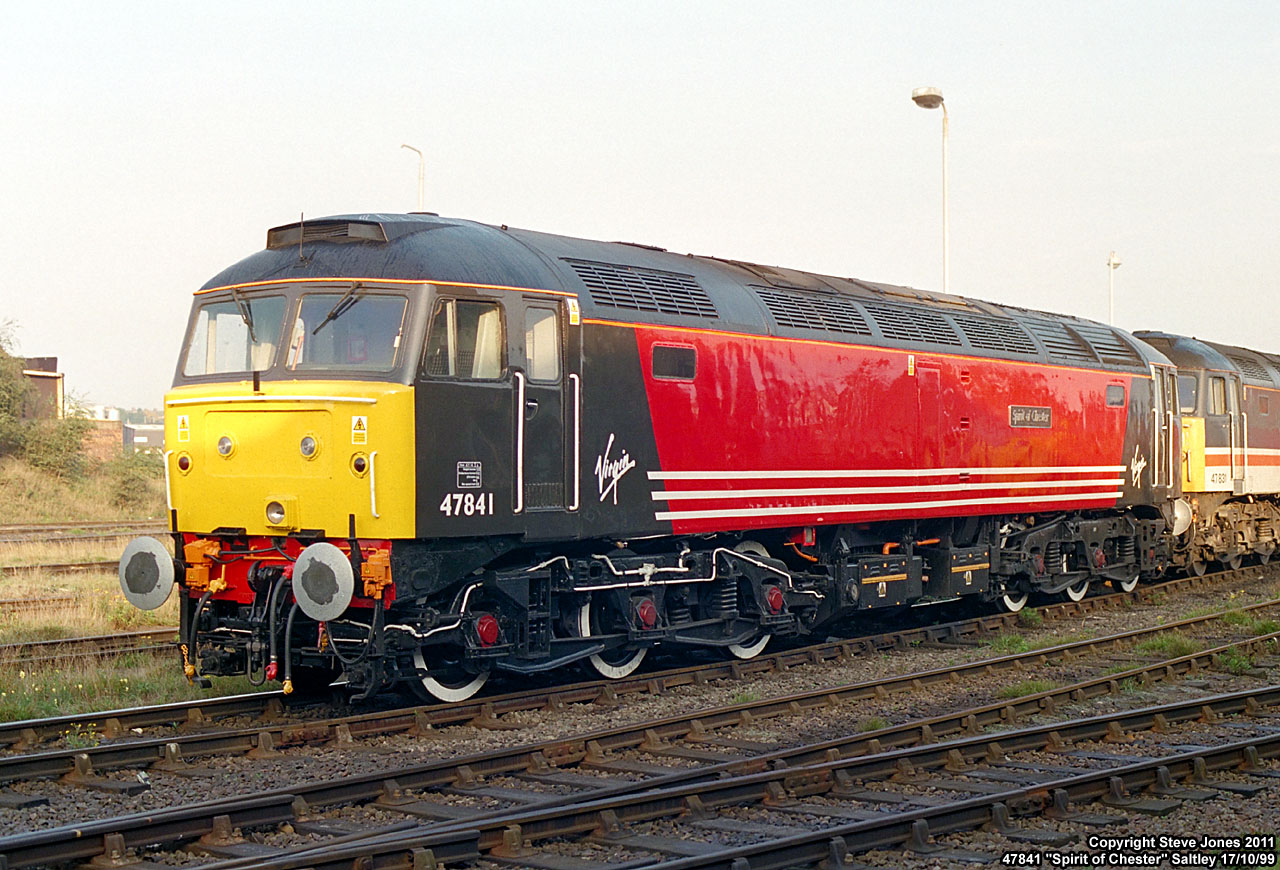
- Locomotive 47841, one of the trains involved in the crash, pictured in 1999

Details
- Date: 4th August 1990; 23:36 UTC
- Location: Stafford, Staffordshire
- Country: England
- Line: West Coast Main Line
- Cause: Driver error

Statistics
- Trains: 2
- Passengers: Unknown
- Crew: Unknown, likely 3-4
- Deaths: 1
- Injured: 36

The 1990 Stafford rail crash occurred on 4 August 1990, after an Empty Coaching Stock (ECS) Class 310 (Unit 310102), returning to Birmingham Soho TMD collided with a stationary express train formed of a Class 47 (47841) hauling eight Mark 2 coaches and one Mark 1 RMB at Stafford railway station.

== Collision ==
The 11:36 pm empty coaching stock train (service 5G15) from Stoke-on-Trent to Birmingham Soho TMD ran into the rear of the 10:18 pm express passenger train (service 1V27) from Manchester Piccadilly to Penzance, which was standing in platform 4 at Stafford station. The empty train had been signalled to draw up behind the express in order to clear the way for another train, but did not stop in time and hit the back of the 10:18 pm service.

== Casualties ==
The driver of the ECS was the only fatality in the incident. 36 people were injured in the crash.

== Damage ==
Carriage 17134 on the express train suffered "considerable" damage, car No 76189 of the ECS suffered "severe crushing damages" and car No 70740 of the ECS suffered damage to the roof and traction rods.

== Causes ==
The driver of the ECS was considered not to have kept a good lookout. This was possibly compounded by excessive working hours and by the alcohol that was subsequently found in his bloodstream.

== Aftermath ==
The Rule Book was changed to avoid this situation. Now, if a train is to be signalled into an occupied section and that train is not booked to call at that location, the driver must be first advised. Also, before a train can be signalled behind another, the signal ahead of the stationary train must be at danger until the second train has come to a stand, to avoid potential 'over-reading' of the signal by the second driver.

== See also ==
- List of British rail accidents
