= Thomas Gaff House =

Thomas Gaff House could refer to:

- Hillforest, the Thomas Gaff House, in Indiana
- Thomas T. Gaff House, in Washington, D.C.
