= Gaffer =

Gaffer may refer to:

== Media ==
- The Gaffer (TV series), a British comedy television series of the early 1980s
- Gaffer Gamgee, a hobbit character in J.R.R. Tolkien's Lord of the Rings franchise
- Gaffer, a character in The Muppets
- A nickname used by the perpetrator in the Sheffield incest case

== Other uses ==
- Gaffer (boss), a British colloquial term for "boss", "foreman" or "old man"
- Gaffer (occupation), the head of the electrical/lighting department in film or television production
- Gaffer District (Corning, New York), a historic district of downtown Corning
- Gaffer tape, or Gaffa tape, a type of adhesive tape
- Gaffer, a person who blows glass
- Gaffer (sailor), of a gaff rig boat
