= Jerry G. Gaff =

American educational scholar

Jerry G. Gaff is an American educational scholar. He is a fellow at the Association of American Colleges and Universities and has published numerous books on general education and liberal arts education. In 1987–88, he was acting president of Hamline University.
