= 1996 Stafford rail crash =

Rail accident in the United Kingdom

Coordinates: 52°47′6″N 2°6′36″W

Rickerscote (Stafford) rail crash

Details
- Date: 8 March 1996; 23:08
- Location: Stafford, Staffordshire
- Country: England
- Line: West Coast Main Line
- Operator: Rail Express Systems; Transrail
- Cause: Axle failure

Statistics
- Trains: 2
- Deaths: 1
- Injured: 20

The 1996 Stafford rail crash occurred on 8 March 1996 when a Transrail freight train travelling from Mossend, North Lanarkshire, to Willesden, North London, derailed after an axle on a wagon carrying liquid carbon dioxide failed due to fatigue at Rickerscote 1.4 miles (2.2 km) south of Stafford on the West Coast Main Line. Almost immediately after the derailment, a Travelling Post Office mail train hauled by a Rail Express Systems British Rail Class 86 electric locomotive (no 86239) collided with a section of the derailed freight train on the adjacent line and fouled the path of the TPO mail train. One person, a mail sorter, was killed in the crash and twenty others including the driver of the mail train were injured.

The cause of the collision was the failure of an axle on one of the tanker wagons of the freight train. It caused the wagon and adjacent ones to derail, into the path of the closely approaching mail train, which was travelling at 60 mph (97 km/h).

The driver of the mail train had no time to brake and the force of the collision spun the locomotive around and catapulted it up the embankment, where it came to rest against the end wall of a house.

The liquid carbon dioxide formed into a gas as it was no longer under pressure and interfered with the rescue effort. One bystander who had gone to help was later found unconscious after suffering the inhalation effects of carbon dioxide. The rescue services were on the scene within four minutes of being notified, despite the signaller at Stafford having to relay the emergency information via another office because the crash had cut his external phone lines, but he was able to phone his supervisor at Crewe.

The fire service on site were given the wrong staffing list for the mail train - they had been given a manifest for the number of mail workers who would have been on the train northbound after leaving Crewe. However, the ambulance service were given a correct head count list from the Royal Mail workers at the lineside.

During the investigation, it was discovered that the wagon had travelled 69,000 miles (111,000 km) since its last inspection. The recommendation at the time was that wagons were tested every 24,000 miles (39,000 km).

== See also ==
- List of British rail accidents
