= Telford International Railfreight Park =

Rail yard in Midlands England

Coordinates: 52.716°N 2.455°W

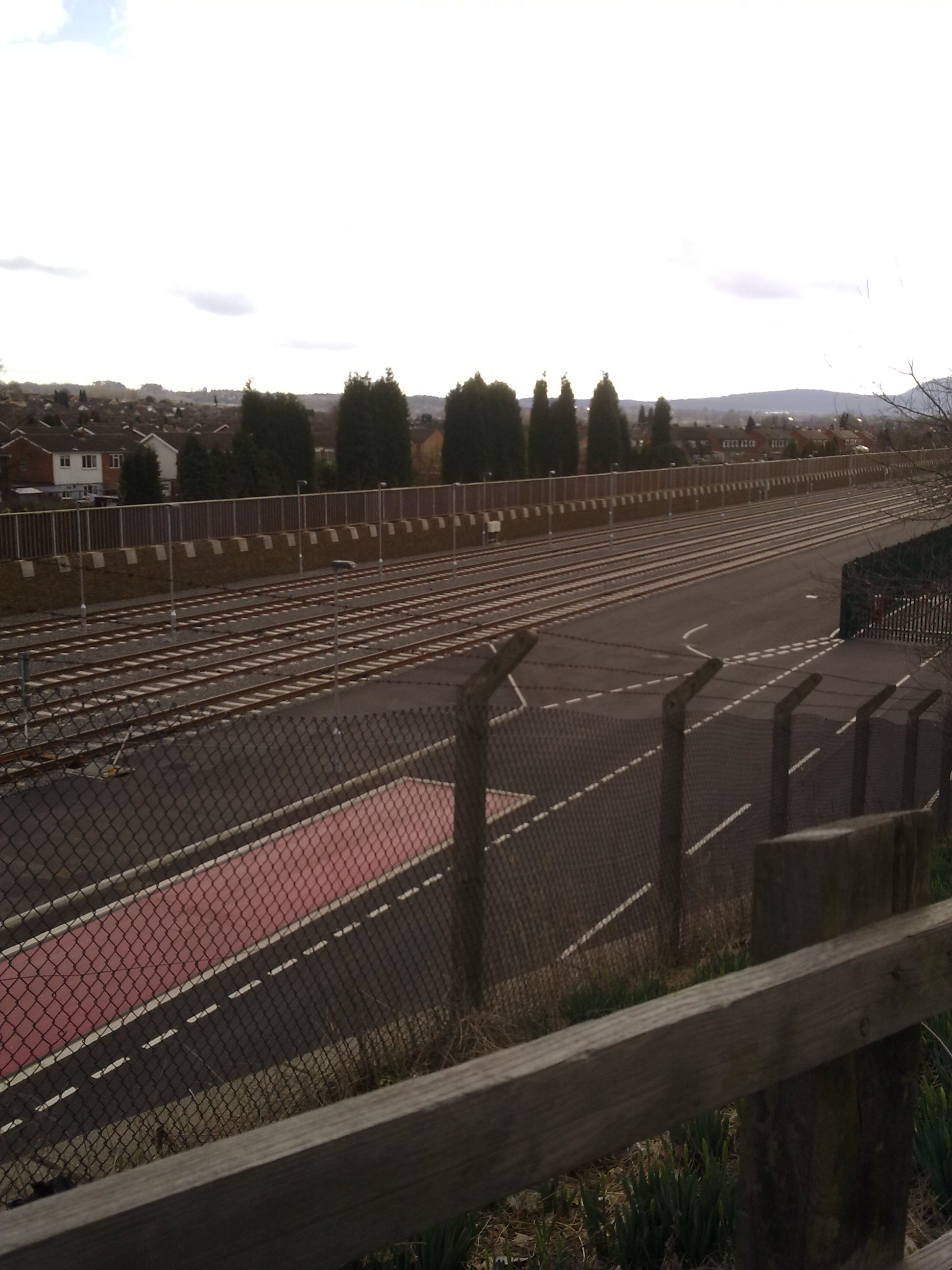
Telford International Railfreight Park

Telford International Railfreight Park (known as TIRFP) is rail freight depot and construction development site located in Donnington to the north of Telford, on the former route of the Stafford–Shrewsbury line. The terminal was opened in 2009.

The development of TIRFP was initiated through a partnership between Telford and Wrekin Council, the Ministry of Defence, and the Homes and Communities Agency (then English Partnerships) in 2001. Located on the former Wellington to Stafford railway line of the Shropshire Union Railway, the 46 acres (0.19 km^{2}) is located 2.5 miles (4.0 km) northeast of Wellington railway station and is connected to the (Network Rail) Wolverhampton–Shrewsbury line just to the east of that station. Located on the former MoD Donnington stores, it is adjacent to existing manufacturing and warehousing facilities in Hadley Park and Hortonwood Industrial Estates. Located off Hortonwood Roundabout on the A518, it closest motorway access is via Junction 5 of the M54.

With development started in 2008, TIRFP was officially opened by Shadow Secretary of State for Transport, Theresa Villiers MP, on Wednesday, 10 June 2009. Owned by Telford and Wrekin Council, the site, when opened, was operated under lease by John G Russell Transport Ltd.

In 2010 the sidings at the railfreight park have also been used to store redundant rolling stock, including Class 508 EMUs (taken to Telford using diesel locomotives), as the park is currently suffering from low freight usage. Wrockwardine Wood and Trench Parish Council approved the original planning application, forwarded to Telford and Wrekin Borough Council with only minor opposition.

In 2012, John G Russell pulled out of running the terminal and DB Schenker Rail (UK) were appointed to take over control of the terminal. DB Schenker have been running the only regular service into and out of the terminal since it reopened (that of a once-a-week MoD train).

Class 196 Diesel multiple units operated by West Midlands Railway were being stored here while awaiting service on their brakes which emit excess noise compared to other multiple units.

Unused sections of the site have been utilised as long term van storage for hire firms. This has enabled the terminal to employ its first full-time worker. The vans arrived on site in March 2015 and DB Schenker Rail (UK) hope that incoming vehicles can be delivered via the rail connection.
