= Donnington, Telford =

Village in Shropshire, England

Coordinates: 52.715°N 2.436°W

Donnington
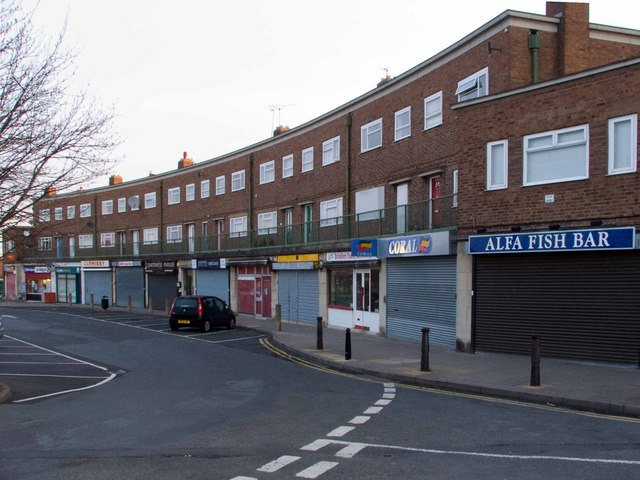
- The Parade, Donnington

- Donnington shown within Telford in Sky Blue.

- Location within Shropshire
- OS grid reference: SJ705131
- Civil parish: Donnington and Muxton
- Unitary authority: Telford and Wrekin
- Ceremonial county: Shropshire
- Region: West Midlands
- Country: England
- Sovereign state: United Kingdom
- Post town: Telford
- Postcode district: TF2
- Dialling code: 01952
- Police: West Mercia
- Fire: Shropshire
- Ambulance: West Midlands
- UK Parliament: The Wrekin

Donnington is a village in the parish of Donnington and Muxton in the borough of Telford and Wrekin in Shropshire, England. The population of Donnington Ward was 6,883 at the 2011 census.

== History ==
Before the Romans arrived in Britain the area around Donnington was a mixture of forest and open rough ground in some respects more suitable to sheep rather than humans. Further down Donnington's low lying valley, north of Donnington, the ground was marshy wetland habitat; today this has been drained for farming. This wet moorland provided protection for pre-Roman Celts living between 300BC and 100AD near the hill fort at the now small settlement of Wall 4 miles (6.4 km) north of Donnington.

The original Donnington village was to the northeast of the current centre of Donnington. A map of Shropshire by John Speed from 1610 refers to Donnington as Dunnyton, the ending ington meaning in Anglo Saxon "Dunny's homestead or farm". This farm was most likely leased from the Saxon Minster of St Alkmund's in Shrewsbury who, when the Normans arrived, held the land around Lilleshall (according to the Domesday Survey (1086)). Following the Norman conquest of England in 1066 the land was eventually passed to Godbald, religious adviser to the Norman magnate Roger de Montgomerie, 1st Earl of Shrewsbury; Godbald's descendants, the Belmeis family, endowed the land in 1145 to the Christian Augustinian foundation from North East France who built Lilleshall Abbey. Over 400 years later the dissolution of the monasteries by Henry VIII ended centuries of church dominated society and the land was purchased in 1539 by James Leveson, a Wolverhampton wool merchant and was then passed down his family's inheritance to eventually become part of the Duke of Sutherland's estate. Leveson's descendants over the centuries invested heavily in draining the sodden moors to the north of Donnington so they could be farmed and in mining coal from the Donnington Wood coalfield. Locals, mostly men, would have found work in these enterprises and at the local farms.

By the early 20th century Donnington was a minor industrial centre where "Walker's works" (C&W Walker Ltd) iron works produced components of gasometers and ship's engines. The Clock Tower restaurant commemorates the landmark Walker's Clock which now sits on a road island near where "Walker's works" once was. This roundabout is just a hundred metres north from the centre of the original village of Donnington. Walker's Clock's distinctive audible blast called the workers living in Donnington and nearby to work and was a time keeper for everyone else. At the same location there was, as shown on an Ordnance Survey map from 1833, Donnington railway station with freight and passenger connections to Wellington and Stafford; this was closed as part of Beeching cuts in 1964. Only 2,000 feet (600 m) further north, at The Humbers, iron-making is thought to have taken place since the late 16th century, with the name 'Humbers' deriving from a set of water-driven ‘hammers’ which in 1580 were owned by the Duke of Sutherland's Leveson ancestors (whose Lilleshall Ironworks was one of the first blast furnaces in the West Midlands). The Hammers were located on or near the site of a mill on Lubstree Pool, which before the dissolution of the monasteries had belonged to the Canons of the nearby Lilleshall Abbey.

At the original Donnington village centre there was a coal wharf linked by rail to the Granville Colliery, Shropshire's last deep coal mine. This mine tapped into the Donnington Wood coalfield (where most of the local coal and ironstone reserves are located and which once came to the surface where it was mined in the 18th century at Donnington Wood). In 1818 the Lilleshall Company began sinking a number of deep mines around Donnington Wood, extracting over 400,000 tons of coal a year from the area by 1871. This industrial heritage links the original Donnington village to the Industrial Revolution that Telford proudly asserts began with the first large scale smelting of iron using coke in the Coalbrookdale area of Telford.

The current centre of Donnington, near the Parade (as in the photo here), is actually the centre of a planned village initially called New Donnington, a housing development that began in the late 1930s when the War Office bought land to house the workers who would be employed at the Donnington Army Ordnance Depot, which became active in 1940 and remains in use as a logistics base. The new planned town of Telford that includes Donnington was a separate planned development begun in 1963.

== Today ==
Donnington is a ward of Telford with a long parade of shops down the high street. In the 21st century this has grown with an Asda superstore and an Aldi supermarket added to the Co-op supermarket that already existed. Additionally, a Home Bargains supermarket has replaced the Netto then Netto replaced Morrison's supermarket in the centre of Donnington on the site of the old pub "The Champion Jockey".

The Telford International Railfreight Park (TIRF), opened in 2009 has been developed on a 48 acres (0.19 km^{2}) site formerly part of the MoD depot, given rail access by rebuilding 2.5 miles (4.0 km) of the former Shropshire Union Railway west towards Wellington. It is expected this development will attract more light industry to the industrial estates near Donnington.

Donnington is home to a small amateur dramatics company "The Little Theatre" and each year the Broadoaks playing fields play host to a Guy Fawkes fair and bonfire night.

== Notable people ==
- Norman Jones (1932–2013), actor mainly on TV, born in Donnington.
- Barrington J. Bayley (1937–2008), science fiction writer, came to live in Donnington as a child during the Second World War.

=== Sport ===
- Robbie Brightwell (1939–2022), track and field athlete who appeared in the 1964 Olympics, grew up in Donnington after his family returned to England from India.
- Super Bantamweight boxer Liam Davies (born 1996) is from Donnington. He leads the division in the UK.

== Bibliography ==
- Frost, Allan (2001). Donnington and Muxton.
