= Stafford–Shrewsbury line =

Railway line in Staffordshire, England

The Stafford–Shrewsbury line is a former railway line in England, which ran between Stafford in Staffordshire and Shrewsbury in Shropshire, via Newport and Wellington, from 1849 to 1966. The Shropshire Union Railways and Canal Company (SUR&CC) constructed and ran one of the few railways in England ever built by a canal company. The line served Newport and Wellington stations. The SUR&CC were solely responsible for the section from Stafford to Wellington; but the building and operation of the 10.5 mile (17 km)-long Shrewsbury-to-Wellington section was shared with the Shrewsbury and Birmingham Railway.

== Takeover by LNWR ==
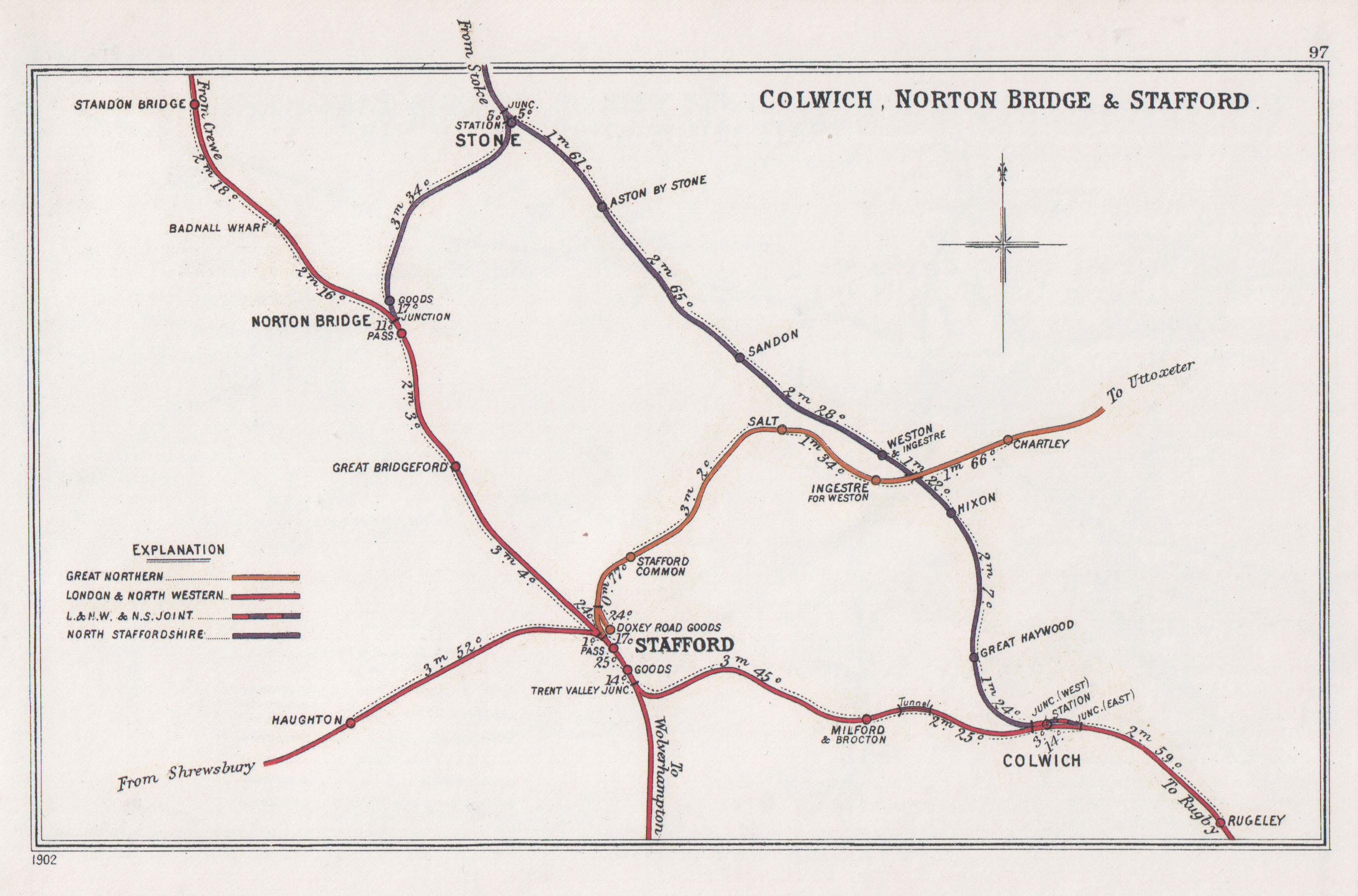
Lines around Stafford

After the London and North Western Railway (LNWR) takeover of the SUR&CC, the Shrewsbury and Wellington Railway was operated as a Joint railway by the Great Western Railway and the LNWR.

The Stafford to Shrewsbury Railway opened on 1 June 1849, and was 29.25 miles (47 km) in length. The London and North Western Railway leased the line from July 1847, before it was complete.

== Closure ==
Passenger services on the Stafford to Wellington section ended on 7 September 1964. Goods services ceased between Stafford and Newport on 1 August 1966, and this branch from Wellington was cut back to Donnington on 22 November 1969. The last remaining stretch of track, from Wellington to Donnington, was lifted in 1991.

== Restoration ==
A single-track stretch of the line, measuring approximately three kilometres in length, was reinstated in 2008 and 2009, linking Wellington to the newly built Telford International Railfreight Park. The Shrewsbury and Wellington section is still in use today by Transport for Wales, West Midlands Railway and Avanti West Coast.

In June 2009, the Association of Train Operating Companies, in its report Connecting Communities: Expanding Access to the Rail Network, called for funding for the reopening of the line from Stafford to Wellington as part of a £500m scheme to open 33 stations on 14 lines closed in the Beeching Axe, including seven new parkway stations.

In March 2011, a group called the Shropshire, Telford and the Marches Strategic Rail Group voted to lobby government to invest in reopening the line, which included building new stations serving Donnington in north Telford, Newport, Shropshire and Gnosall, stating that it would be a quicker alternative for a direct link to London. the estimated cost of this would be roughly £230 million.

In January 2019, Campaign for Better Transport released a report identifying the line which was listed as Priority 2 for reopening. Priority 2 is for those lines which require further development or a change in circumstances (such as housing developments).

In January 2020 the UK Government announced a £500m fund to support the reopening of disused stations and lines closed under the Beeching cuts. The Shropshire, Telford and the Marches Strategic Rail Group and Wrekin MP Mark Pritchard called for the reopening of the Stafford-Shrewsbury Line to reconnect Donnington and Newport.
