= Goldstone, Shropshire =

Hamlet in Shropshire, England

Coordinates: 52.852°N 2.436°W

Goldstone
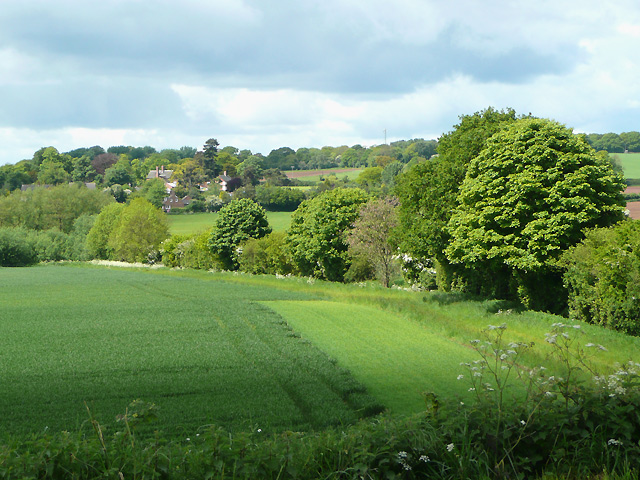
- Goldstone, viewed across the surrounding farmland

- Location within Shropshire
- OS grid reference: SJ706284
- Civil parish: Cheswardine
- Unitary authority: Shropshire
- Ceremonial county: Shropshire
- Region: West Midlands
- Country: England
- Sovereign state: United Kingdom
- Post town: MARKET DRAYTON
- Postcode district: TF9
- Dialling code: 01630
- Police: West Mercia
- Fire: Shropshire
- Ambulance: West Midlands
- UK Parliament: North Shropshire

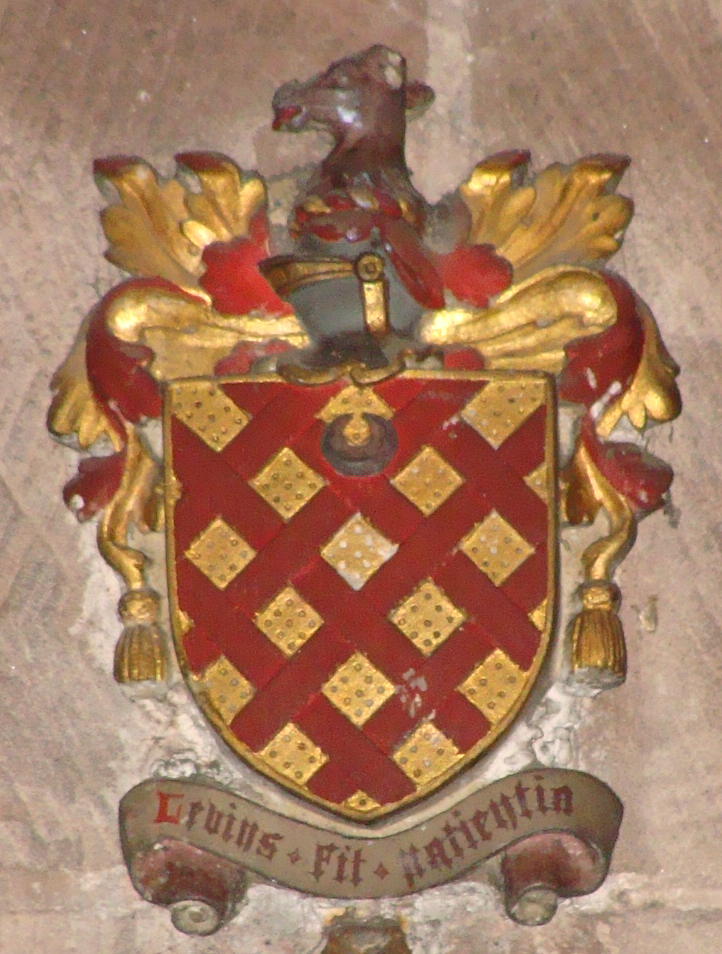
The coat of arms of William Vardon of Goldstone Hall (1783–1856), lord of the manor of Goldstone, from his memorial inside St. Swithun's Church, Cheswardine. The heraldry of the shield is Or, Fretty Gules, illustrating the connection with the de Verdun/Verdon family of Alton, Staffordshire; the crest of a stag's head should have antlers, but these broke off many years ago

Goldstone is a small hamlet in eastern Shropshire, England, in the civil parish of Cheswardine. It lies in an isolated rural area north of Hinstock and Ellerton, around 5 miles (8 km) south of the nearest town, Market Drayton.

== History ==
Its name, which in the mediaeval period was variously spelt Goldestan, Golston, and Goldston, is formed on the Old English -tun ("farm, settlement") while Gold- was a common element in Old English personal names. The first time it is mentioned is in the Mount Gilbert (i.e. Wrekin) Forest Roll of 1180, when Goldestan is listed among those places where assarts (pieces of land cleared of timber and fit for tilling), or imbladements (the sowing of lands within the bounds of a Royal forest) were assessed, and an Alan de Goldestan is named. A Walter de Goldestan is then mentioned in the Pipe Roll records for Shropshire in the 31st year of the reign of King Henry II (i.e. 19 Dec 1184 – 18 Dec 1185), and again in the following year (32 Henry II), where he appears as one of the associates/followers of Gilbert Pipard (otherwise 'Pippard'), a man who is found appointed to a number of important roles by Henry II, and quite often with Bertram III de Verdun, in England and Ireland.

In 1278 Goldstone was recorded as forming, with Ellerton and Sambrook, one of the four townships of Cheswardine parish, and it remains part of the parish to this day. In the 13th century Goldstone was recorded as an outlying member of the manor of Little Ercall (Child's Ercall) the change possibly dating from a period in which tenure of the two manors was nearly identical.

However, it is clear that at some point in time a subordinate lord was enfeoffed at Goldstone and that it became a sub-manor of Child's Ercall. In 1280, specific reference was made to a separate Lord of Golston in an extent of the manor of Cheswardine, then held by Roger le Strange, who was at that time also lord of Child's Ercall. Other members of Childs Ercall – Naggington and Dodicote – had also become separate manors. The lordship of Goldstone continued to be held separately from that of Child's Ercall by the Goldstone family of Goldstone, who are first mentioned in the 12th century as 'de Goldestan'. The Goldstones appear to have added another property to Goldstone itself, since they are found living at their manor of Dunval, near Bridgnorth in Shropshire, in the 16th century. As a result, members of the family appear in the registers of Astley Abbotts and are mentioned as resident in Astley Abbotts parish from the 15th century. Some information on Richard's father Humphrey Goldston is found in a History of Parliament Trust publication, The House of Commons 1509–1558. It confirms that Humphrey was one of the members of Parliament for Bridgnorth, and that in 1541 he was receiving income of lands at Astley Abbotts, north of Bridgnorth, formerly belonging to Shrewsbury Abbey. Dunval Hall is Elizabethan and was clearly built by the Goldstones since they were living there and owned it at the time that it was constructed. It seems most likely that it was John Goldstone of Goldstone and Dunval who built it; he married Dorothy Ottley, daughter of Adam Ottley of Pitchford Hall, on 22 October 1576 at Pitchford. The family continued to reside at Dunval, and continued to own lands there and be connected to the place into the early part of the 17th century. The Acton family who later owned it may have made alterations; they appear to have become related to the Goldstones by marriage.

The Goldstones appear to have relocated themselves to London, in the late 1600s/early 1700s, and lived off The Strand, at one time in Howard Street. This may explain why the lordship and manor of Goldstone was passed to the Goldstone's cousin Edward Pegg, who already had land nearby at Ellerton, in 1720 via the use of a legal method called The Common Recovery; he had married Jane Goldstone, daughter of Lawrence Goldstone of Goldstone. Pegg and his successors built and extended a newer Goldstone Hall next to the older manor house, parts of which he must have incorporated since some much older possibly Tudor or earlier wooden beams have been discovered within its structure. From Pegg, the estate and manor of Goldstone passed to other cousins of the Goldstones – the Haywards of Aston Cliffe, Staffordshire and Hulme Walfield, in the Parish of Astbury (Newbold Astbury), near Congleton, Cheshire. Thomas Hayward had his estate at Goldstone plotted on a map painted on vellum, entitled: Goldstone Lordship, and Estates in the Parish of Hinstock and County of Salop, Belonging to Thomas Hayward Esq, Surveyed 1771 by John Wedge.

On the death of the last of the Haywards, Goldstone, along with their estate at Hulme Walfield, was inherited by their cousin William Vardon, whose family also came from Cheshire. The Vardons are a branch of the de Verdun (Verdon) family from Normandy (ref: de Verdun of Alton, Staffordshire), whose name changed from Verdon to Vardon in the later 17th century. William Vardon must have made some structural changes to the Hall since one wall has a feature which incorporates his crest of a stag's head with his initials "WV" underneath. The building that replaced the original old Manor House at Goldstone was finally incorporated into and connected to the newer Goldstone Hall by Henry G. E. ("Jack") Vardon, heir of Hugh E. Vardon of Goldstone (nephew of William Vardon), after the First World War. The more modern property named 'Goldstone Manor' is the farmhouse of Goldstone Manor Farm, rather than the structure or site of the historic Manor.

The original border between Shropshire and Staffordshire was Goldstone Brook, which formed the boundary between the manors of Cheswardine and Goldstone, Cheswardine originally being in Staffordshire. Edward Hayward of Goldstone made an interesting reference to some old manorial marker stones that demarcated Goldstone from Cheswardine, in an entry in his Journal dated 21 May 1805, as follows: This day Mr Pierpoint of Ellerton told me that the proper old course of the Goldstone Brook is by the Gate going into Sowdley Lane which is also the Boundary of Goldstone Manor. This he heard the late Mr E. Pegg of Goldstone declare when he refused to give one of the large stones there to [---?] Jones the Miller. It is perhaps possible that these marker stones may have more than significance as a part of Goldstone and Cheswardine's manorial history, but also that of the counties of Shropshire and Staffordshire, since they could also have been boundary stones marking the original border between Shropshire and Staffordshire.

== Goldstone today ==
As in many rural areas of Britain, the rural depopulation of the 19th and 20th centuries has left Goldstone with only a few dwellings clustering around Goldstone Hall, a Georgian brick house (now a hotel) with an earlier core. A well in its garden is reputed to be the deepest in Shropshire.

The hamlet gives its name to the Goldstone Brook, which rises nearby. It has been surmised that the surnames Goldstone, Gulson and Goulson similarly or first appeared either here or in Goldstone in Kent, but are far more likely to have arisen quite separately, based on the same form of Anglo-Saxon personal names of people associated with these places named after them.

== See also ==
- Listed buildings in Cheswardine
