= Listed buildings in Chetwynd Aston and Woodcote =

Chetwynd Aston and Woodcote is a civil parish in the district of Telford and Wrekin, Shropshire, England. It contains 13 listed buildings that are recorded in the National Heritage List for England. Of these, one is listed at Grade II*, the middle of the three grades, and the others are at Grade II, the lowest grade. The parish contains the villages of Chetwynd Aston and Woodcote. In the parish is the country house of Woodcote Hall; this, structures associated with it, and the nearby church and churchyard wall are listed. The other listed buildings are houses, farmhouses, and a gateway.

== Key ==
Grade	Criteria
II*	Particularly important buildings of more than special interest
II	Buildings of national importance and special interest

== Buildings ==
Name and location	Photograph	Date	Notes	Grade
St Peter's Chapel; 52.73587°N 2.34563°W	—	Late 12th century	The chapel was restored in 1882–84 when the east wall was rebuilt and the vestry was added. It is in sandstone with a tile roof, and consists of a nave and a chancel in a single cell, and a north vestry. At the west end is an octagonal timber bellcote with a lead-covered cupola. The south doorway dates from the 12th century; it has two orders of shafts, crocket capitals, and an arch with one keeled order. The east window is in Perpendicular style, and the other windows are square with two lights.	II*
Little Hales Manor House and outbuilding 52.74282°N 2.37367°W		16th century	A timber framed house, heavily restored in the 19th century, on a sandstone plinth with a tile roof. There is much applied timber framing and the rear has been encased in brick. There are two storeys, a three-bay central range, a gabled cross-wing on the left, and two similar cross-wings on the right. The windows are casements, and there are two gabled porches. The outbuilding wing at the northwest has a sandstone ground floor and is timber framed above with plaster infill.	II
Brandon House; 52.73662°N 2.33946°W	—	17th century	The house was extended in the 18th and again in the 19th century. The original part is timber framed with red brick infill, a tile roof, one storey and an attic, and two bays. The windows are casements and there are gabled dormers. The larger extensions at the rear are in red brick and have two storeys.	II
28 Chetwynd Aston; 52.75481°N 2.36350°W		17th or 18th century	A house in red brick encasing timber framing or stone, with dentil eaves and a tile roof. There are two storeys, and a central range flanked by gabled cross-wings, that on the right projecting slightly. The windows are casements, and there are two canted bay windows.	II
Churchyard boundary wall 52.73541°N 2.34526°W	—	17th or 18th century	The wall encloses the churchyard of St Peter's Chapel. It is a low sandstone wall with saddleback coping.	II
Aston Manor; 52.75489°N 2.36292°W	—	Early 18th century	A brick house on a sandstone plinth, with string courses and a tile roof, it has two storeys, a front of two bays, and a large rear extension. The windows are three-light sashes with stone lintels. In the centre is a doorway with pilasters and an entablature.	II
Pave Lane Farmhouse; 52.74584°N 2.35600°W	—	18th century	The farmhouse is in brick with dentil eaves and a hipped tile roof. There are two storeys, three bays, a gabled rear wing giving an L-shaped plan, and a later wing to the east. The doorway has a moulded architrave, a rectangular fanlight, and an entablature. The windows are sashes with segmental heads.	II
Stockton Grange; 52.74858°N 2.34040°W	—	18th century	A red brick house with a hipped tile roof. There are two storeys, a symmetrical front of two bays, and to the left is a later wing with one storey and an attic. In the centre is a porch with pilasters and a pediment, and the windows are sashes with segmental heads.	II
Kitchen garden walls, Woodcote Hall; 52.73575°N 2.34723°W	—	18th century	The walls enclose the kitchen garden to the southwest of the hall. They are in red brick with stone coping.	II
Stable and Coach House range, Woodcote Hall; 52.73668°N 2.34669°W	—	18th century	The stable and coach house are in red brick on a stone plinth, with quoins and a hipped tile roof. There are two storeys, a five-bay central range, end wings projecting forward, and single-storey rear wings, giving an H-shaped plan. In the centre is a rusticated round-headed archway, the windows in the upper floor are circular and most have been replaced by modern casements, and in the roof is a clock tower.	II
Upper Farmhouse; 52.75541°N 2.36622°W	—	Early 19th century	A red brick house with a dentil eaves course and a tile roof. It has three storeys and three bays. In the lower two floors are mullioned and transomed with segmental heads. On the side is a Victorian porch.	II
The Golden Gates; 52.75127°N 2.36281°W		c. 1840	At the entrance to the drive leading to Lilleshall Hall is a gateway consisting of wrought iron gates, gate piers and flanking screens containing pedestrian gates with overthrows. At the ends are sandstone piers, each with a ball finial.	II
Woodcote Hall; 52.73660°N 2.34587°W		1875	A country house incorporating material from an earlier house that was destroyed by fire. It is in red brick with stone dressings and a tile roof, and has two storeys and attics. The main front has a total of eleven bays, which include pavilions with lead ogee roofs, a central canted bay with a shaped gable, and a round-arched doorway. There are rusticated quoins, a parapet with a stone balustrade and ball finials, and the windows are sashes with Gibbs surrounds. The garden front has seven bays, a canted bay window and shaped gables.	II
