= Listed buildings in Chetwynd, Shropshire =

Chetwynd is a civil parish in the district of Telford and Wrekin, Shropshire, England. It contains 32 listed buildings that are recorded in the National Heritage List for England. Of these, three are listed at Grade II*, the middle of the three grades, and the others are at Grade II, the lowest grade. The parish contains the Chetwynd Park estate, and the small settlements of Pickstock, Howle, and Sambrook, and is otherwise completely rural. Some of the listed buildings are associated with the Chetwynd Park estate, and most of the others are houses and associated structures, farmhouses and farm buildings. Also listed are two churches, a medieval cross, water mills, bridges, a former windmill, and a war memorial.

== Key ==
Grade	Criteria
II*	Particularly important buildings of more than special interest
II	Buildings of national importance and special interest

== Buildings ==
Name and location	Photograph	Date	Notes	Grade
Remains of Cross, Manor Farm; 52.80390°N 2.40600°W	—	Medieval (probable)	The remains of the cross are in sandstone, and consist of a small stepped plinth, and the base of a cross shaft.	II
12 and 13 Howle; 52.80690°N 2.46211°W	—	17th century	A timber framed house with brick infill on a stone plinth with a tile roof. It has one storey and an attic, two bays, and brick lean-tos at the rear. The windows are casements, and there are two gabled dormers.	II
Manor Farmhouse; 52.81951°N 2.42564°W	—	1702	A red brick house with sandstone quoins, a string course, a moulded eaves cornice, and a tile roof with stone coped gables. There are two storeys and an attic, five bays, and a rear wing. The ground floor windows are sashes, and in the upper floor they are mullioned and transomed. In the centre is a porch with pilasters, an entablature, and a date plaque.	II*
Mow Cop; 52.81635°N 2.40325°W	—	1749	A red brick house with a string course, dentil eaves, and a tile roof with crow-stepped gables. There are three storeys, three bays, and a later two-storey wing to the left. In the centre is a doorway with a segmental head and a gabled hood. The windows are mullioned and transomed, they have segmental heads, and contain casements. The central window in the middle floor is blind, and contains a datestone.	II
Piers and wall, Home Farmhouse; 52.81850°N 2.42561°W	—	18th century	The gate piers are in sandstone with brick panelled sides and moulded bases, the end piers are in brick, and all have moulded cornices and ball finials. Linking them is a red brick wall with stone coping.	II
Garden wall and gate piers, Manor Farm; 52.81937°N 2.42571°W		18th century	The gate piers are in stone with brick panels, and have moulded bases and cornices. On either side are brick walls with stone copings.	II
Showell Mill; 52.81476°N 2.41849°W	—	18th century	A brick watermill with dentil eaves that has a tile roof with parapeted gables. There is one storey, an attic and a basement. The doorway and windows have segmental heads. In the south wall are pigeon holes, and there are two stone plaques.	II
Showell Mill House; 52.81476°N 2.41849°W	—	18th century	A brick cottage with dentil eaves and a tile roof. It has two storeys and three bays. Above the door is a hood on large shaped brackets, and the windows are casements.	II
Chetwynd Grange; 52.78813°N 2.42170°W	—	Late 18th century	A red brick house with dentil eaves and a tile roof. There are two storeys and an attic, three bays, and gabled rear wings. In the centre is a wooden trellis porch and a doorway with a segmental head, and the windows are Venetian.	II
Dovecote, Chetwynd Park; 52.79022°N 2.39310°W		Late 18th century	The dovecote is in red brick with a string course, a moulded brick dentil eaves cornice and a hipped tile roof. It has an octagonal plan with panels on each side. On the south side is a round-arched doorway, and inside are about 700 nesting holes.	II
Stable range northwest of Chetwynd Park; 52.79135°N 2.39289°W	—	Late 18th century	The stable range is in pink sandstone with a hipped slate roof. It has a single storey and contains five rusticated round-arched stable doorways. At the south end is a higher pyramidal roof and a blind round-headed arch. The range has been converted into housing.	II
Stable range west-northwest of Chetwynd Park; 52.79119°N 2.39272°W	—	Late 18th century	The stable range is in red brick with a hipped slate roof. It has a single storey and a loft, and a total of nine bays. The middle and end bays project forward and contain blind round-headed arches and imposts, and above the middle bay is a pedimented gable. There is a central doorway with a rectangular fanlight, and the windows are small and square. The range has been converted into housing.	II
New Caynton Mill House; 52.80346°N 2.45528°W		Late 18th century	A brick house with a string course, dentil eaves, and a tile roof with parapeted gables. There are three storeys and three bays. The central doorway has a moulded surround. Most of the windows are sashes with segmental heads, and there are two small casement windows in the top floor.	II
Beechhill; 52.77511°N 2.38204°W	—	c. 1801	A stuccoed house with a hipped slate roof, two storeys and five bays. There is a portico with pilasters, a keyblock and a semicircular head, and a doorway with a semicircular head and a fanlight. The windows are sashes.	II
Cottage north of stables, Chetwynd Park; 52.79142°N 2.39208°W	—	Early 19th century	The cottage is in rendered brick with a slate roof, and is in Gothick style. It has one storey and four bays. There is a gabled porch and a doorway with a pointed arch and a Gothick fanlight. The windows have pointed arches and intersecting tracery.	II
Chetwynd Knoll; 52.77628°N 2.38420°W	—	Early 19th century	A stuccoed house in Regency style with a hipped slate roof. There are two storeys and three bays, the centre bay projecting under a pediment. In the centre is a porch with cast iron columns and a tent-shaped zinc roof, and the doorway has a moulded surround and side lights. The windows are sashes in moulded architraves, those in the ground floor having tent-shaped zinc canopies. On the west side is a canted bay window.	II
Cart shed and loft range, Manor Farm; 52.81953°N 2.42614°W		Early 19th century	The farm buildings are in red brick and sandstone, and have tile roofs. There are four bays, with blind arcading on the front facing the road, and cart bays and a loft above facing the farmyard. External stone steps lead up to a loft door.	II
New Caynton Mill; 52.80326°N 2.45602°W	—	Early 19th century	A watermill in red brick with dentil eaves, and a slate roof with parapeted gables. It has two storeys and a long range. There are segmental-headed openings, some blocked and some with cast iron small-paned windows, and gabled hoist housing.	II
Puleston Bridge; 52.79417°N 2.39534°W		Early 19th century	The bridge carries a road over the River Meese. It is in sandstone, and consists of three round rusticated arches with cutwaters. The bridge has string courses and parapets with splayed ends.	II
Stanford Bridge Farmhouse; 52.81219°N 2.44153°W	—	Early 19th century	A red brick house with a slate roof. There are two storeys and three bays. In the centre is a doorway with moulded and fluted pilasters, and an entablature with a fluted frieze. The windows are sashes, and flanking the doorway are canted bay windows.	II
Windmill; 52.80794°N 2.4531°W	—	Early 19th century	A small sandstone windmill, it is circular and slightly tapering. There are three storeys, a doorway on the ground floor, and a small square window in each storey.	II
Stanford Bridge; 52.81087°N 2.43992°W		Early to mid 19th century	The bridge carries a road over the River Meese. It is in pink sandstone, and consists of three round rusticated arches with cutwaters, above which are pilasters and keystones. The bridge has string courses and parapets with splayed ends.	II
Sambrook Mill House; 52.81824°N 2.42598°W	—	Mid 19th century	The house is in sandstone, and has a tile roof with parapet gables. There are two storeys and five bays, the outer bays recessed. The middle bay is gabled and contains a gabled porch. The windows have iron frames, small panes, and segmental heads.	II
Whitleyford Bridge; 52.81161°N 2.37766°W		Mid 19th century	The bridge carries a road over Lonco Brook. It is in sandstone, and consists of a single segmental arch with a rusticated vault, a keyblock, and a moulded string course. The parapet has plain coping and curved splayed ends.	II
Sambrook Mill; 52.82118°N 2.42647°W	—	1853	Originally a watermill, later converted into a house, it is in red brick with sandstone dressings, and has a tile roof with stone coped gables. There are three storeys, a basement and an attic, four bays, and a single-storey range to the southeast. The doorway has a moulded surround, there is a date plaque, and cast iron multi-pane windows with segmental heads.	II
St Luke's Church, Sambrook; 52.81723°N 2.42494°W		1855–56	The church, designed by Benjamin Ferrey in Decorated style, is in red sandstone with tile roofs. It consists of a nave, a north aisle, a south porch, a chancel, and a vestry. At the west end is a belfry, the lower part weatherboarded, on which is a truncated pyramidal roof surmounted by a broach spire. In the west gable end is a rose window.	II*
Bridge near St Luke's Church; 52.81754°N 2.42120°W	—	1856	The bridge carries a road over a tributary of the River Meese. It is in sandstone, and consists of a single rusticated round arch. The bridge has string courses, keystones, and parapets with piers.	II
St Michael and All Angels' Church; 52.78869°N 2.39348°W		1865–67	The church, designed by Benjamin Ferrey, is in red sandstone with buff ashlar bands and a tile roof. It consists of a nave, a lean-to south aisle, a north porch, a chancel, and a north steeple. The steeple has a tower with buttresses, a polygonal stair turret, clock faces, and a broach spire with lucarnes. The porch is gabled, and has an arch on scalloped corbels. At the west end of the nave is a wheel window, in the chancel are lancet windows, and the east window has three lights with Geometrical tracery.	II*
Lodge, Chetwynd Park; 52.78446°N 2.38454°W	—	c. 1860	The lodge has applied timber framing with roughcast infill on a stone plinth. It has a slate roof and gables with ornate pierced bargeboards, pendants and finials. There is one storey, a square bay window, and a canted bay window. The porch is gabled and has twisted balusters, the windows are casements with diamond-shaped panes, and in the centre is a large chimney stack.	II
Church Lodge; 52.78891°N 2.39228°W	—	c. 1860	The lodge is in stone and applied timber framing, and has a slate roof with gables and ornate pierced bargeboards. It is in Gothic style, and has one storey and an attic. The windows are lancets with cusped arches and cornices above. In the end bays is a canted bay window, and all the windows have diamond tracery. Above the doorway is a hood on large pierced brackets, and there is a large central chimney stock.	II
Pool Lodge; 52.77913°N 2.38238°W	—	c. 1860	The lodge is in sandstone with a string course and slate roof, and is in Gothic style. It has two storeys and an asymmetrical plan, and gables with ornate openwork bargeboards. The windows have pointed cusped heads and diamond tracery. In the ground floor are three canted bay windows.	II
Sambrook War Memorial; 52.81745°N 2.42474°W	—	c. 1920	The war memorial is in the churchyard of St Luke's Church. It is in stone, and has an octagonal three-stepped base, a square plinth, a tapering shaft, and a Latin cross. On the plinth are inscriptions and the names of those lost in the two World Wars.	II
