= Pave Lane =

Hamlet in Shropshire, England

Coordinates: 52.747°N 2.357°W

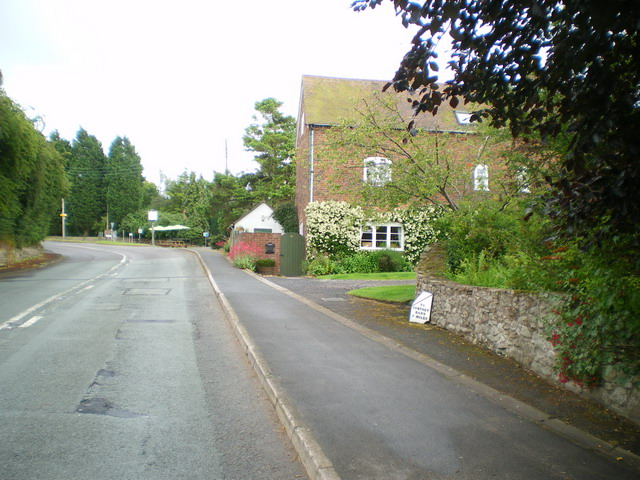
- Pave Lane

- Location within Shropshire
- OS grid reference: SJ759166
- Civil parish: Chetwynd Aston and Woodcote
- Unitary authority: Telford and Wrekin
- Ceremonial county: Shropshire
- Region: West Midlands
- Country: England
- Sovereign state: United Kingdom
- Post town: NEWPORT
- Postcode district: TF10
- Dialling code: 01952
- Police: West Mercia
- Fire: Shropshire
- Ambulance: West Midlands
- UK Parliament: The Wrekin

Pave Lane is a hamlet in Shropshire, England, 2 miles (3.2 km) south of Newport, just outside the small village of Chetwynd Aston in the civil parish of Chetwynd Aston and Woodcote. It has numerous large houses, many of which have been built in a Duke of Sutherland-inspired architectural style. Residents have excellent views of the Shropshire countryside and are in close proximity to Lilleshall Hall.

There is a large public house in Pave Lane; 'The Fox'.

== History ==
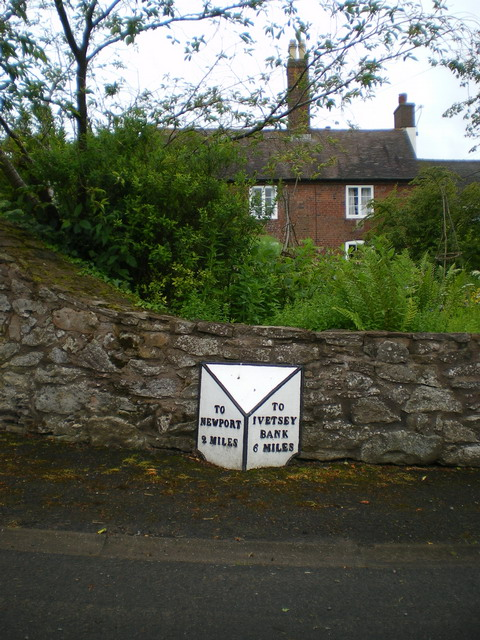
A historic milepost on the former A41 road through Pave Lane.

Because of its location on a toll road between Newport and Wolverhampton, which became the A41, the area became the site of many inns and coach houses.

By 1767 it had become the site of a small lime works and brick works owned by local landlord Lord Gower, who made Pave Lane the terminus of Donnington Wood Canal. Limestone and coal was sold at the wharf at Pave Street and supplied the growing town of Newport with coal. The rise of railways and carriages meant the canal went into decline and the Pave Lane stretch of the canal closed in 1882; the canal has since been filled in.

The A41 road no longer runs through Pave Lane, instead it now passes on a new alignment just to the east of Pave Lane and Chetwynd Aston.

== Notable people ==
Former leader of the Labour Party, Jeremy Corbyn, and his brother Piers Corbyn, the weather forecaster, lived from childhood at Pave Lane until after leaving school. They lived at Yew Tree Manor, a 17th-century brick house used as an inn until their parents bought and renovated it for use as the family home. It appears on Ordnance Survey maps as Yew Tree Manor.
