= Donnington and Muxton =

Civil parish in Shropshire, England

Coordinates: 52.715°N 2.422°W

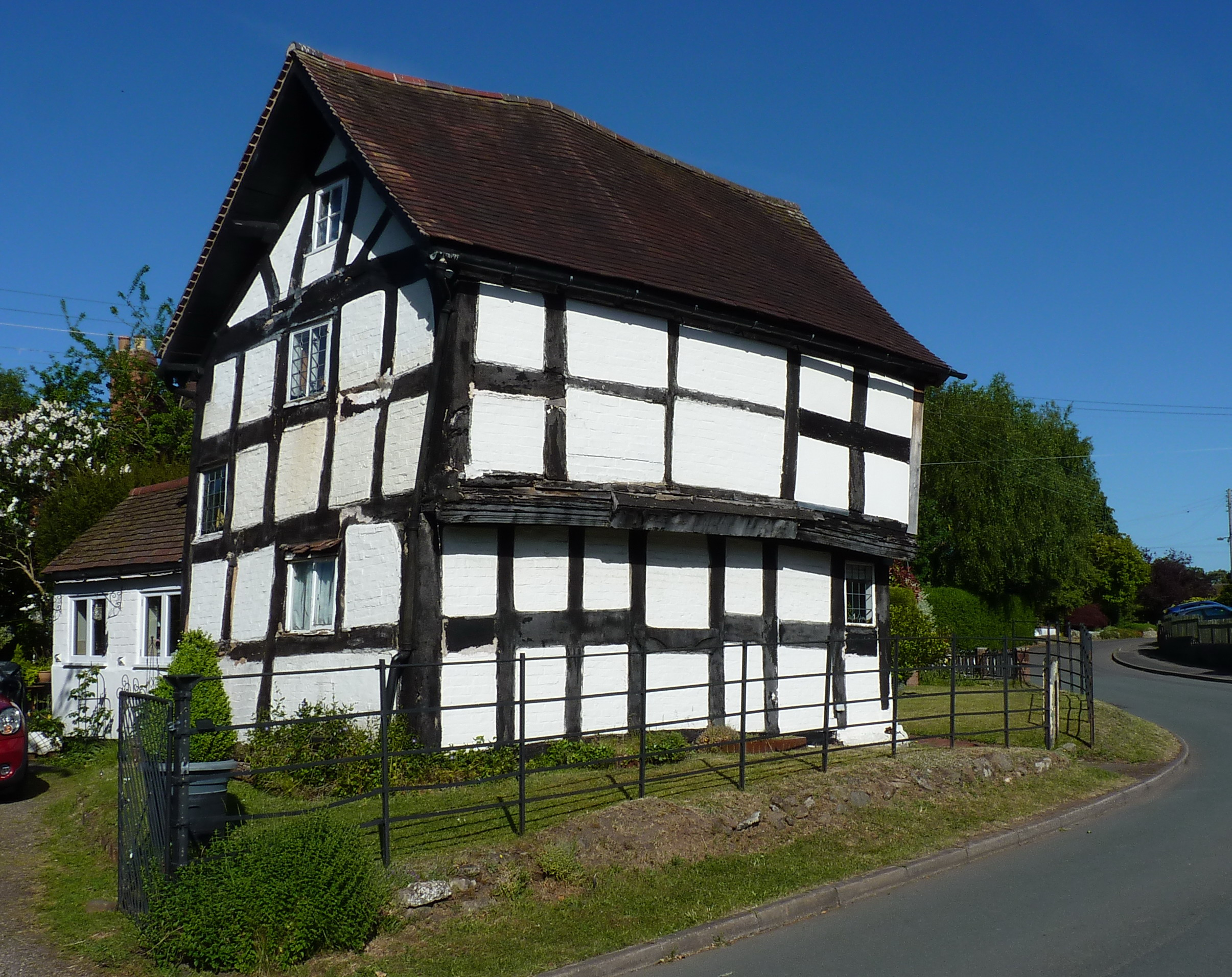
- A listed 16th-century house in Muxton

- Location within Shropshire
- Area: 12.17 km^{2} (4.70 sq mi)
- Population: 13,950 (2021 census)
  - Density: 1,146/km^{2} (2,970/sq mi)
- Civil parish: Donnington and Muxton
- Unitary authority: Telford and Wrekin
- Ceremonial county: Shropshire
- Region: West Midlands
- Country: England
- Sovereign state: United Kingdom
- Police: West Mercia
- Fire: Shropshire
- Ambulance: West Midlands
- Website: https://www.donningtonmuxton-pc.gov.uk/

Donnington and Muxton is a civil parish in Telford and Wrekin unitary area, in the ceremonial county of Shropshire, England.

The parish includes the villages of Donnington and Muxton, and part of the area known as The Humbers. The parish is to the north east of Telford town centre, and its eastern boundary is the county boundary with Staffordshire.The A518 road crosses the northern part of the parish, and the A41 road, the ancient Watling Street, forms its southern boundary. In 2021 the parish had a population of 13,950.

It has a parish council, the lowest level of local government in England. There are 13 councillors representing four wards: Donnington East ward elects one councillor, Donnington West ward two, Muxton ward five and The Humbers ward one.

The parish was formed on 1 April 2015 when the former parish of Lilleshall, Donnington and Muxton was divided, forming this parish and the parish of Lilleshall.

As of 2024 there are 13 listed buildings in the parish, all at grade II, and five scheduled monuments which include Roman remains, part of the context of the Augustinian Lilleshall Abbey (the grade I listed abbey itself being in Lilleshall parish), and two colliery sites.

== See also ==
- Listed buildings in Lilleshall and Donnington Previous parish boundaries
