= Shawbirch =

Village in Shropshire, England

Coordinates: 52.718°N 2.530°W

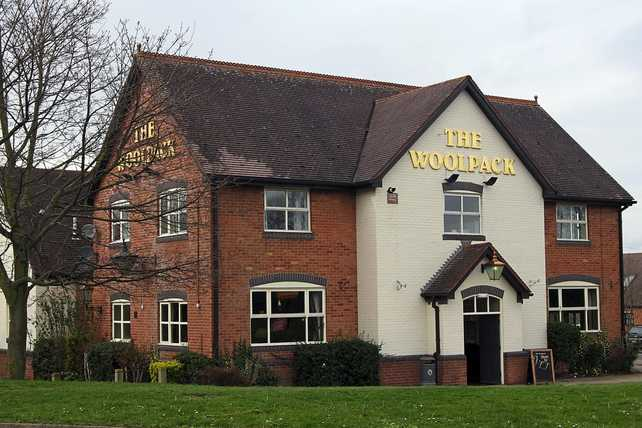
- The Woolpack pub in Shawbirch

- Shawbirch is the 29th ward of Telford and Wrekin

- Location within Shropshire
- Population: 2,919 (2021)
- OS grid reference: SJ 643 135
- Unitary authority: Telford and Wrekin
- Ceremonial county: Shropshire
- Region: West Midlands
- Country: England
- Sovereign state: United Kingdom
- Post town: TELFORD
- Postcode district: TF5
- Dialling code: 01952
- Police: West Mercia
- Fire: Shropshire
- Ambulance: West Midlands
- UK Parliament: The Wrekin

Shawbirch is a village in the Telford and Wrekin borough of Shropshire, England. It is located west of Admaston, north of Wellington and east of Hortonwood.

== History ==
Throughout the second millennium, Shawbirch was mostly covered by woodland, which later was repurposed for farmland within the township of Eyton upon the Weald Moors. The development of Shawbirch as it is known today was created on predominantly agricultural land during the 1980s as part of the evolution of Telford new town. Designated for such in 1968 along with Hortonwood, the first phase of the Shawbirch scheme was completed in 1982, at which point the Telford new town had a surplus of new housing and regarded Shawbirch as the final necessary development scheme.

Since then, there have been numerous developments in Shawbirch. The Maxell/Elements Europe factory in Apley is to be demolished to meet new housing demands, with 375 homes to be built to incorporate into the community of Shawbirch. New developments have not always been welcome, however; Mark Pritchard MP, who represents Shawbirch as part of Wrekin constituency, has said the local councils responsible for Shawbirch developments have committed "environmental vandalism", adding that the scale of new developments such as housing is neither proportionate nor sustainable. Furthermore, in 2019, strong local opposition forced the backdown of the building of a 40m high toilet paper factory on 80,000 square metres of land, that was meant to be part of a larger planned industrial estate, in Shawbirch.

== Services ==
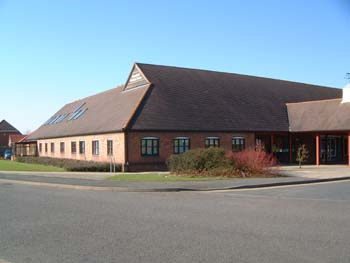
Shawbirch Community Centre

Shawbirch has a veterinary centre and a pub. Shawbirch also includes a 24-hour service station, with a hotel and a restaurant.

=== Shawbirch Community Centre ===
Shawbirch Community Centre consists of a pharmacy, a dental centre, and a hair and beauty salon. Shawbirch Medical Centre also used to co-occupy this space but has now moved to a purpose-built venue in Admaston. There is also a supermarket which was refurbished and expanded in November 2020 to incorporate a bakery and a Post Office.

== Attractions ==
Behind the Shawbirch Community Centre there are the Rough Pits - a wood with two man-made lakes. Also located in the Shawbirch borough are the Beanhill Woods and the Dothill Nature Reserve. Apley Woods is located one mile away. Also located in Shawbirch is the Brockwood Copse playground.

== Politics ==
The Shawbirch ward falls under The Wrekin constituency which currently has a Conservative seat in Parliament, held since 2005 by Mark Pritchard.

The polling station for Shawbirch is located at the back of the Shawbirch Community Centre in the Little Chicks Preschool. The member of Telford and Wrekin Council for Shawbirch is Liberal Democrat Cllr Bill Tomlinson. He was elected in 2003, 2007, 2011 2015, 2019, and 2023.

== Demography ==
In the 2021 census, the population was recorded as 2,919, with 52% of residents being female and 48% being male. This is a decrease from 2011 where the population was recorded as 3,239.

90.9% of residents were born in England, the next biggest percentage was Wales with 2.3%. The mean age in Shawbirch is 38.1, which is lower than the national average.

100% of people in Shawbirch speak English, higher than the Telford and Wrekin borough average of 99.8%. 98.5% of people in Shawbirch speak English as their main language. Of the 1.5% whose main language is not English, 1.2% speak English well and 0.3% do not speak English well. The next biggest language spoken was 0.2% who speak Czech as their main language. 0.1% also speak British Sign Language.

93.7% of residents are White British, and Other White make up 1.5% for a total white population of 95.2% - lower than that of Shropshire's average at 98% and higher than that of Telford and Wrekin's average at 92.7%. The largest non-white ethnic group in Shawbirch is Asian British with 2.2% of the population. 1.3% of residents are mixed race, 0.9% are Black British and 0.3% are in another ethnic group.

In Shawbirch, 54.7% of residents are married. 12.6% live with a partner of the opposite sex, while 0.4% live with a partner of the same sex. 20.5% are single, have never been married and have never been partnered with the same sex. 7.9% are divorced/separated and there are 155 widows living in Shawbirch.

67.6% of people who live in Shawbirch identify themselves as a Christian. 22.8% identify as non-religious and the next biggest religion was Islam with 0.9%. Out of the 3,239 residents, 230 did not answer and 12 identified as a Jedi Knight.

74.7% of Shawbirch residents are employed, with the most common occupation category being "Professional occupations" at 19.5% of the employed population.

== Education ==
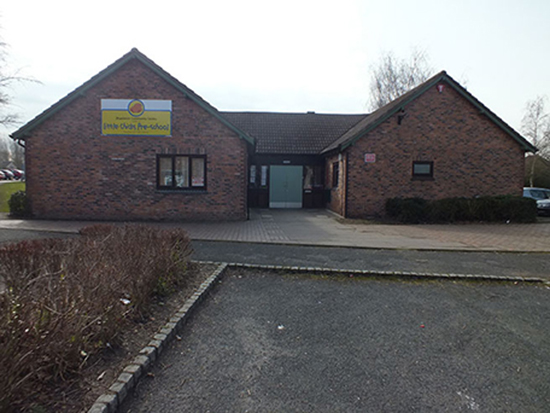
Little Chicks Preschool

Little Chicks Preschool is located at the back of the Shawbirch Community Centre, and Ercall Day Nursery is located at the nearby Princess Royal Hospital.

St. Peter's Church of England Primary is the nearest primary school to Shawbirch, located in nearby Bratton. Dothill Primary School is less than one mile from Shawbirch, with other primary schools including Old Hall, St. Patrick's Roman Catholic and Wrekin View Primary located in the nearby town of Wellington.

== Health services ==
There is a medical centre, a pharmacy and a dental practice located in the Shawbirch Community Centre, and a veterinary centre is also located in Shawbirch. The Princess Royal Hospital is located in the neighbouring village of Apley.

== Transport ==
=== Bus ===
The 15 bus route from Telford to Arleston and 16 bus route from Telford to High Ercall run through Shawbirch and are both operated by Arriva Midlands.

=== Train ===
The nearest train station is the Wellington, which operates services to places like Birmingham New Street and Shrewsbury Station. Other nearby stations include Telford Central.

=== Car ===
The B5063 and B4394 runs through Shawbirch. The A442 Queensway is located at the Shawbirch roundabout opposite the service station. The M54 motorway is at the back of the nearby Wrekin Retail Park.
