= Chetwynd Aston =

Coordinates: 52.755025°N 2.367524°W

- Village
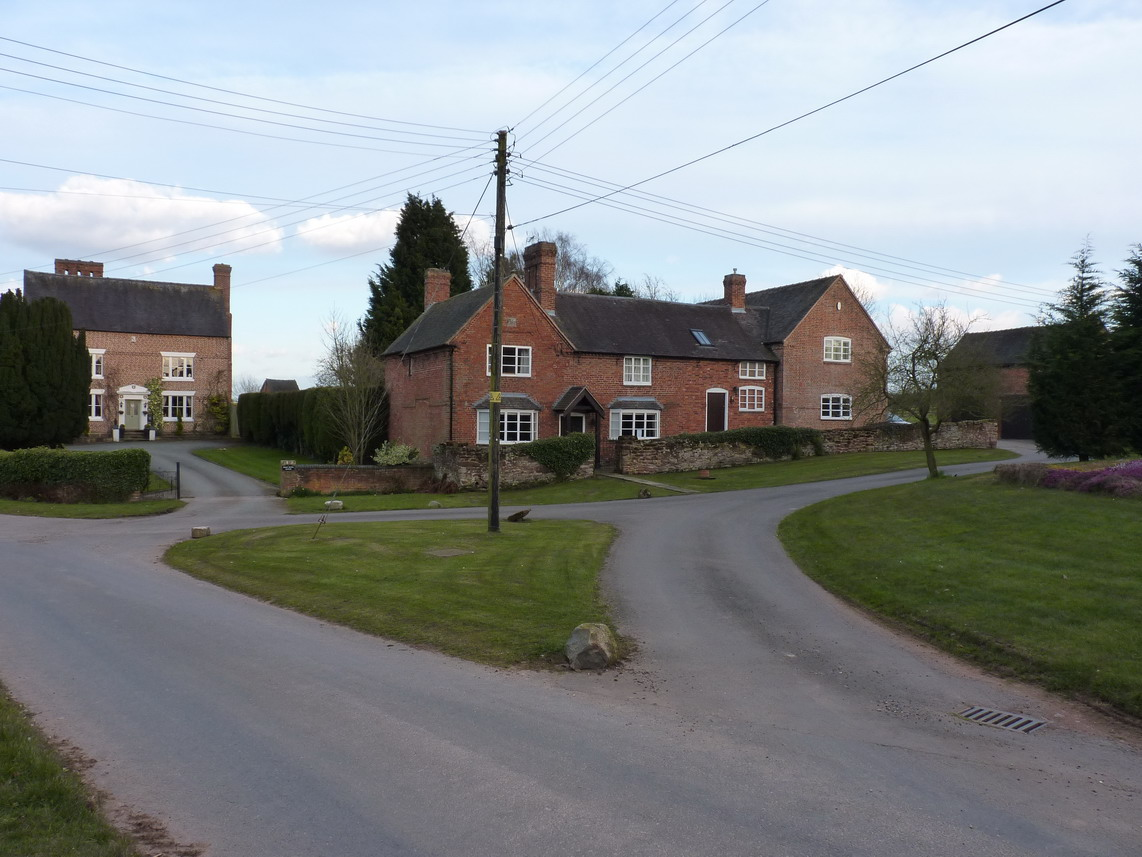
- Chetwynd Aston

- Location within Shropshire
- OS grid reference: SJ753175
- Civil parish: Chetwynd Aston and Woodcote
- Unitary authority: Telford and Wrekin
- Ceremonial county: Shropshire
- Region: West Midlands
- Country: England
- Sovereign state: United Kingdom
- Post town: NEWPORT
- Postcode district: TF10
- Dialling code: 01952
- Police: West Mercia
- Fire: Shropshire
- Ambulance: West Midlands
- UK Parliament: Wrekin

Chetwynd Aston is a village in the civil parish of Chetwynd Aston and Woodcote, in the Telford and Wrekin district, in the ceremonial county of Shropshire, England, south of Newport.

Aston derives from Old English elements, meaning eastern settlement, and Chetwynd derives from a family name.

There are several listed buildings in the village's immediate area, including a farmhouse. The land around the village is classified as Grade 2. Geologically, the village lies on a mix of sandstone and conglomerate formed in the Triassic period called the Chester Formation, with areas of Quaternary-period till, although an area of Permian sandstone lies nearby to the southwest.

Chetwynd Aston was formerly a township in the parish of Edgmond, in 1866 Chetwynd Aston became a separate civil parish, in 1894 the parish was abolished and split to form Chetwynd Aston Urban and "Chetwynd Aston Rural", on 1 April 1934 Chetwynd Aston Rural was renamed to "Chetwynd Aston". On 1 April 1988 the parish of Woodcote was merged with Chetwynd Aston, on 2 November 1988 the merged parish was renamed "Chetwynd Aston and Woodcote". In 1971 the parish of Chetwynd Aston (prior to the merge) had a population of 253.
