= RAF Chetwynd =

Former RAF base in Shropshire, England

RAF Chetwynd
- Chetwynd, Shropshire in England

Site information
- Type: Satellite Station
- Owner: Air Ministry
- Operator: Royal Air Force
- Controlled by: RAF Flying Training Command

Location
- Shown within Shropshire
- Coordinates: 52°48′45″N 02°24′22″W

Site history
- Built: 1940
- In use: September 1940 - unknown
- Battles/wars: Second World War

Airfield information
Runways
Direction	Length and surface
00/00	Grass
00/00	Grass

Royal Air Force Chetwynd or more simply RAF Chetwynd is a former Royal Air Force satellite station located in Chetwynd, Shropshire, England.

The following units were here at some point:

- No. 5 (Pilots) Advanced Flying Unit RAF
- No. 5 Service Flying Training School RAF
- No. 6 Flying Training School RAF
- Central Flying School
- Shropshire Gliding Club
