= Listed buildings in Lilleshall and Donnington =

Lilleshall and Donnington is a civil parish in the borough of Telford and Wrekin, Shropshire, England. It contains 34 listed buildings that are recorded in the National Heritage List for England. Of these, three are listed at Grade I, the highest of the three grades, and the others are at Grade II, the lowest grade. The parish contains the village of Lilleshall and the surrounding countryside, as well as the villages of Muxton and Donnington. Most of the listed buildings are houses and associated structures, farmhouses and farm buildings, a high proportion of which are timber framed and date from the 16th and 17th centuries. The other listed buildings include the ruins of an abbey and its garden wall, two churches, and a monument.

== Key ==
Grade	Criteria
I	Buildings of exceptional interest, sometimes considered to be internationally important
II	Buildings of national importance and special interest

== Buildings ==
Name and location	Photograph	Date	Notes	Grade
Lilleshall Abbey; 52.72481°N 2.38983°W		12th century	The abbey was badly damaged during the Civil War, and is now a ruin. Much of the abbey church remains, including a Norman doorway, the north and south transepts, the crossing, the chancel and its chapels, the vestry, and the sacristy. Of the abbey buildings, the remains include the cloisters, much of the chapter house, and the refectory. The remains are also a Scheduled Monument.	I
St Michael's Church; 52.73452°N 2.40324°W		12th century	The chancel was lengthened and the north aisle was added in the 14th century, and the church was restored in 1856–58 by John Norton. The church is in sandstone with a tile roof, and consists of a nave, a south porch, a long north aisle and chapel, a chancel, and a west tower. The tower is Perpendicular in style, it has two stages, diagonal buttresses, a quatrefoil frieze, an embattled parapet, and crocketed pinnacles. In the south wall are two Norman doorways, the chancel is Early English in style, the west windows and the windows in the aisle are Decorated, and the five-light east window dates from the restoration.	I
Abbey wall 52.72339°N 2.38844°W	—	Medieval	The wall is to the southeast of Lilleshall Abbey and marks the boundary of the garden. It is in stone, and has been breached in three places.	I
45 Muxton Lane; 52.72441°N 2.41969°W		Early to mid 16th century (probable)	A timber framed house with brick infill, and a tile roof with gabled ends. There are two storeys, and the upper floor of the long front is jettied with a moulded bressumer. The windows are casements, and there is a 19th-century single-storey wing.	II
27 Church Road; 52.73469°N 2.40153°W	—	c. 16th century	Originally a hall house into which a floor was inserted, and a wing added in the 19th century. It is timber framed with rendered infill on a brick plinth, the extension is rendered, and the roof is tiled with gabled ends. The original part has one storey and an attic and three bays, and the extension has one storey and one bay. The windows are casements and there are two gabled dormers.	II
9 Church Road; 52.73232°N 2.40643°W	—	16th to 17th century	A row of timber framed cottages with brick infill and a roof of wood shingle with gabled ends. There is one storey with attics, and a long range. The windows are casements and there is one gabled dormer.	II
2 Church Road and The Shiel; 52.73155°N 2.40810°W	—	17th century	No. 2 Church Road is a timber framed cottage with rendered infill and a tile roof. It has one storey and an attic, one bay, and a later rear wing. The windows are casements, and there is an eaves dormer. The Shiel to the north dates from the 18th century, it is in stone, and has an asbestos sheet roof, one storey and an attic, two bays, casement windows, and two flat-roofed dormers.	II
24–28 Wellington Road; 52.72448°N 2.43036°W	—	17th century	A row of three timber framed cottages with tiled roofs and gabled ends. They have one storey and attics, and each cottage has one bay. The windows are casements, and there are three gabled dormers.	II
31–35 Wellington Road; 52.72529°N 2.42950°W	—	17th century	A timber framed cottage that has a tile roof with gabled ends. It has one storey and an attic, and four bays. The windows are casements, and there are four gabled dormers.	II
54 Wellington Road; 52.72548°N 2.42547°W	—	17th century	A timber framed cottage with brick and plastered infill and a thatched roof. There is one storey and an attic, and two bays. The windows are casements.	II
Hayfield; 52.73216°N 2.40731°W	—	17th century	A timber framed house that was later encased in red brick, it has a tiled roof with gabled ends. There is one storey and an attic, and a U-shaped plan. Most of the windows are casements, and there are gabled dormers.	II
Honeysuckle Cottage and Mill House; 52.73296°N 2.40503°W	—	c. 17th century	A pair of timber framed cottages that were later altered. Each cottage has one storey and an attic, a tile roof with gabled ends, a gabled porch, casement windows, and two gabled eaves dormers. Honeysuckle Cottage, on the left, has been encased in brick, and has two bays and a gabled rear wing. Mill House is roughcast with two original bays and a single-bay stone extension to the right.	II
Laneside and the Beaches; 52.73358°N 2.40464°W	—	c. 17th century (or earlier)	A pair of timber framed cottages that were later faced in red brick. They have a tile roof, one storey and an attic, and three bays. The windows are casements, and there are four gabled eaves dormers. At the rear are gabled brick wings.	II
Barn, Lilleshall Hill Farm; 52.73613°N 2.39909°W	—	c. 17th century	The barn is timber framed with brick infill, and has a tile roof with crow-stepped gables. On the north side is a cart entrance, the west end has been faced in brick and a garage door inserted, and in the east gable end are a loft door, ventilation slits, and pigeon holes with ledges.	II
Limekiln Bank; 52.73739°N 2.39828°W	—	c. 17th century	The house is timber framed, and it was much altered in the 19th century when it was refaced in brick, leaving some exposed timber framing at the rear. The roof is tiled with gabled ends, there are two storeys, three bays, and a brick rear wing. The windows are casements, and there is a gabled timber porch.	II
Muxton Manor; 52.72431°N 2.42025°W	—	17th century	A farmhouse that has been considerably altered, it is timber framed with plastered infill, the north gable end is tile-hung, and it has a tile roof. There is one storey and an attic, the windows are casements, and there are two gabled dormers.	II
St Matthew's Vicarage; 52.72568°N 2.42815°W	—	17th century	The vicarage was extended in the 19th century with the addition of a rear wing. It is timber framed with a tile roof, one storey and an attic, and four bays. There is a porch in the angle with the rear wing, the windows are casements, and there are two gabled eaves dormers.	II
The Cottage; 52.73170°N 2.40778°W	—	c. 17th century	A timber framed cottage, partly stuccoed, but mainly refaced in brick, and with a tile roof that has gabled ends and a parapet at the east end. There is one storey and an attic, three bays, and a later two-storey rear wing, giving an L-shaped plan. On the west side is exposed timber framing, the porch is gabled and has a hood mould, the windows are casements with segmental heads, and there is a gabled dormer.	II
The Old Cottage; 52.73592°N 2.39663°W	—	17th century	The cottage has been extended and altered. It is timber framed with roughcast infill, and has a tile roof with gabled ends. There are two storeys and an attic, and lean-to extensions along the front. Most of the windows are casements, there is a large modern flat-roofed dormer, and at the rear is a range of 20th-century brick cottages.	II
Tudor Cottage; 52.73143°N 2.40819°W	—	17th century	A timber framed cottage that has been encased in stone and is mainly plastered. It has a tile roof, one storey and an attic, and two bays. On the front is a gabled porch, the windows are casements, and there are two gabled dormers.	II
Lilleshall Grange; 52.72825°N 2.40217°W	—	1653	The house is in sandstone with a tile roof. There are two storeys and an attic, four bays, and an extension on the east end with one storey and an attic. The windows are casements, at the rear is a porch, a datestone, and a stone carved with a coat of arms.	II
1 and 3 The Green; 52.73644°N 2.39895°W	—	17th or 18th century	A pair of timber framed cottages that were faced in brick in the 19th century. They have a tile roof, one storey and an attic, three bays, and a modern extension at the rear of No. 3. The windows are casements, and there are three gabled dormers.	II
1 and 2 The Incline; 52.73101°N 2.38768°W	—	18th century	A brick house later divided into two dwellings, it has a tile roof with parapeted gable ends. There are two storeys and attics, and two bays. The windows, which are casements, and the doorway have segmental heads.	II
Lilleshall Hill Farmhouse; 52.73604°N 2.39953°W	—	18th century	The farmhouse is in rendered brick with a dentil eaves course, and has a tile roof with coped gables and shaped kneelers. There are two storeys, four bays, and a rear wing. The windows are sashes with segmental heads, and the doorway has pilasters.	II
Former canal bridge 52.72448°N 2.38874°W	—	c. 1768	The bridge crossed the former Donnington Wood Canal. It consists of a single brick segmental arch with a stone string course. The parapet has been replaced by iron railings.	II
Watling Street Grange; 52.69703°N 2.41283°W	—	1823	A brick house with a dentil eaves cornice and a hipped tile roof. There are two storeys and three bays. The windows are sashes, there is a central doorway with a plain architrave, a rectangular fanlight, and a flat hood, and above it is a plaque with a coronet and the date.	II
3 and 5 Bradley Road; 52.71210°N 2.42939°W	—	Early 19th century	A pair of rendered red brick workers' cottages with a tile roof. They have a single-depth plan and one storey, and the windows are casements. Wash-houses, privies, and a stable and pigsty have survived.	II
Honnington Grange; 52.73151°N 2.41167°W	—	Early 19th century	A red brick house with a hipped tile roof and two storeys. It has a U-shaped plan, consisting of a three-bay central range flanked by projecting one-bay wings. The windows are sashes, and the doorway has reeded pilasters, and a rectangular fanlight.	II
Muxton House; 52.72350°N 2.41743°W	—	Early 19th century	A red brick house with a tile roof, two storeys, and a symmetrical front of three bays. The windows are sashes with lintels and keyblocks. In the centre is a porch with Tuscan columns and an entablature.	II
Northern wash-house 52.71220°N 2.42949°W	—	Early 19th century	The former wash house is at the rear of Nos. 3 and 5 Bradley Road. It is in red brick, partly rendered, and has a single storey. The building contains a doorway and casement windows.	II
Southern wash-house 52.71206°N 2.42947°W	—	Early 19th century	The former wash house is at the rear of Nos. 3 and 5 Bradley Road. It is in red brick, partly rendered, and has a single storey. The building contains a doorway and casement windows.	II
Sutherland Monument; 52.73740°N 2.40273°W		1833	The monument commemorates George Leveson-Gower, 1st Duke of Sutherland. It consists of a stone obelisk 70 feet (21 m) high on a square plinth on a stepped square base. On the north side is an inscribed tablet.	II
St Matthew's Church; 52.71476°N 2.43090°W		1843	The church, designed by George Gilbert Scott in Early English style, is built in stone with tile roofs. A baptistery and vestry were added to the west end in 1965–66. The church otherwise consists of a nave with a south porch, north and south transepts, and a chancel. Above the west end of the nave is a gabled bellcote. The windows are lancets, and the east window is a triple lancet.	II
Garden railings, Muxton House; 52.72340°N 2.41769°W	—	Mid 19th century	At the entrance to the front garden are cast iron railings and a gate. The railings have arrowheads and intersecting tracery.	II
