= Cheswardine =

Village and civil parish in Shropshire, England

Coordinates: 52.866667°N 2.416667°W

Cheswardine, Shropshire
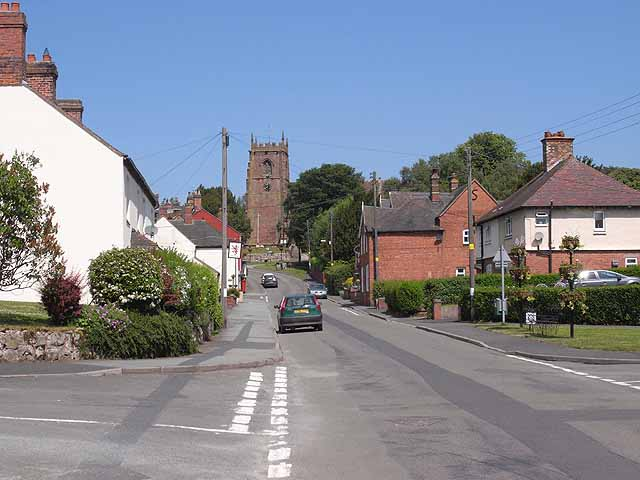
- Cheswardine, High Street

- Location within Shropshire
- Population: 1,076 (2011 census)
- OS grid reference: SJ720299
- Civil parish: Cheswardine
- Unitary authority: Shropshire
- Ceremonial county: Shropshire
- Region: West Midlands
- Country: England
- Sovereign state: United Kingdom
- Post town: MARKET DRAYTON
- Postcode district: TF9
- Dialling code: 01630
- Police: West Mercia
- Fire: Shropshire
- Ambulance: West Midlands
- UK Parliament: The Wrekin

Cheswardine (/tʃɛzwʊərdaɪn/ CHEZ-war-dyne) is a rural village and civil parish in north east Shropshire, England. The village lies close to the border with Staffordshire and is about 8 miles north of Newport and 5 miles south east of Market Drayton. At the 2001 census, the parish (which also includes the villages of Chipnall and Soudley as well as several small hamlets such as Goldstone and Ellerton), had a population of 991 people, increasing to 1,076 at the 2011 Census.

== History and architecture ==
The name Cheswardine, recorded in 1086 as Ciseworde, in 1189 as Chesewordin and about 1650 as Cheswardyne, is probably derived from the Old English for "cheese-producing settlement".

Cheswardine was mentioned in the Domesday Book of 1086, when the manor was held by Robert of Stafford, but is probably a much older settlement, with the church likely being built on an ancient fortified site.

Land 130 metres (430 ft) north of the church was granted to Hamon le Strange in 1155 and a manor house surrounded by a moat built soon after. The manor was rebuilt as a small castle between 1250 and 1350. Ownership passed to the Earl of Arundel and Surrey in 1376. The moat, earthworks and some buried ruins remain, and Cheswardine Castle was scheduled as a historical monument in 1976.

The parish church, dedicated to St Swithun, overlooks Cheswardine from the hill at the top of the village. This is at least the third church on this site, and was rebuilt in 1887-1889 under the direction of the architect John Loughborough Pearson, who died before the work was completed. The work was completed with the assistance of funding by the then squire of the Cheswardine Estate, Charles Donaldson-Hudson, who provided half of the estimated cost of £8,500.

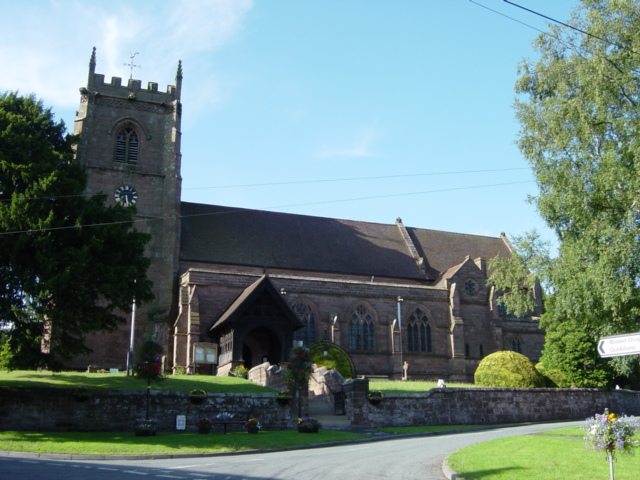
Church of St. Swithun

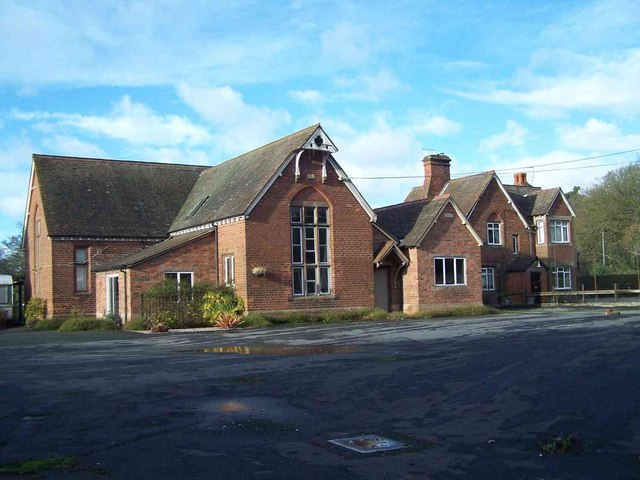
The Old School and School House

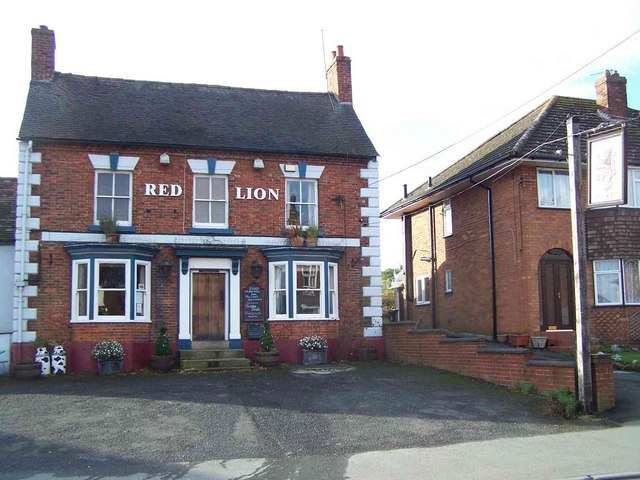
The Red Lion public house

== Governance ==
An electoral ward in the same name exists. This ward stretches north and south with a total population taken at the 2011 Census of 4,240.

== Local amenities ==
Local amenities include a primary school, St Swithun's Church, as well as two village pubs, the Red Lion, and the Fox and Hounds, which serves food. There is also a Parish hall, bowling green and playing fields. However, the local post office was closed down in 2006 and turned into a residential building. A new community village shop (believed to be the smallest shop in Britain) opened in its place in 2010.

== People and awards ==
Conservative MP and former minister Sir Peter Bottomley was baptised at St Swithun's Church, where his parents had married, his mother being a member of the Vardon family of Goldstone Hall. The ashes of his father (Sir James Bottomley), mother, brother and grandparents are buried in the churchyard.

Cheswardine was also home to the late MBE award winner, charity fund-raiser Winnie Goodwin.

The village has been runner-up in Britain in Bloom several times.

== See also ==
- Listed buildings in Cheswardine
