= Chetwynd Aston and Woodcote =

Civil parish in Shropshire, England

Coordinates: 52.746°N 2.351°W

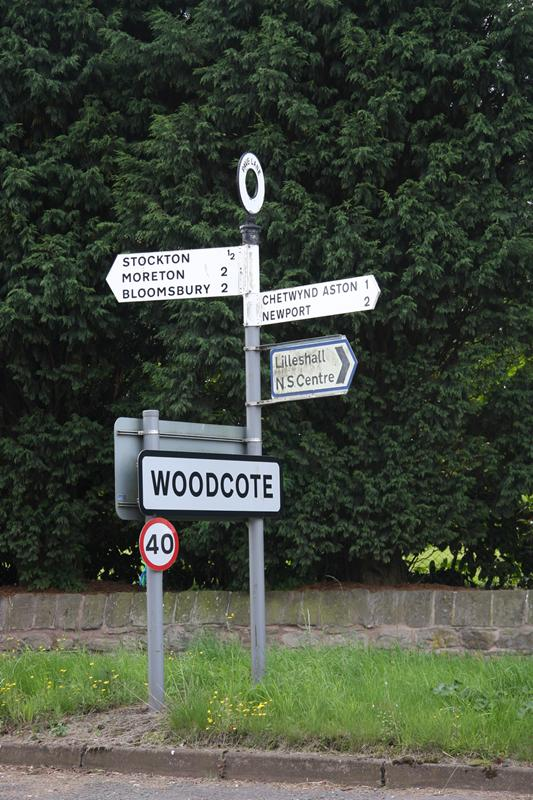
- A signpost in the parish

- Location within Shropshire
- Area: 13.06 km^{2} (5.04 sq mi)
- Population: 674 (2021 census)
  - Density: 52/km^{2} (130/sq mi)
- Civil parish: Chetwynd Aston and Woodcote
- Unitary authority: Telford and Wrekin
- Ceremonial county: Shropshire
- Region: West Midlands
- Country: England
- Sovereign state: United Kingdom
- Police: West Mercia
- Fire: Shropshire
- Ambulance: West Midlands
- Website: https://www.cawpc.co.uk/

Chetwynd Aston and Woodcote is a civil parish in Telford and Wrekin unitary area, in the ceremonial county of Shropshire, England. It is south of Newport, and about 6 miles (10km) north east of Telford. The A41 road runs north-south through the parish, and the A518 road roughly forms its northern boundary, with some overlap. The eastern boundary of the parish forms the boundary between Shropshire and Staffordshire.

The parish includes the village of Chetwynd Aston and the hamlets of Woodcote, Pave Lane, Lynn and Stockton. In 2021 the parish had a population of 674.

It has a parish council, the lowest level of local government in England.

== History ==
In John Wilson's 1870-72 Imperial Gazetteer of England and Wales, Chetwynd Aston is described as "a township in Edgmond parish" and Woodcote as "a chapelry in Sherriff-Hales parish".

On 1 April 1988 the parish of Woodcote was merged with Chetwynd Aston, and on 2 November 1988 the merged parish was renamed to "Chetwynd Aston and Woodcote".

== See also ==
- Listed buildings in Chetwynd Aston and Woodcote
