= Sambrook, Shropshire =

Village in Shropshire, England

Coordinates: 52.818°N 2.426°W

Sambrook
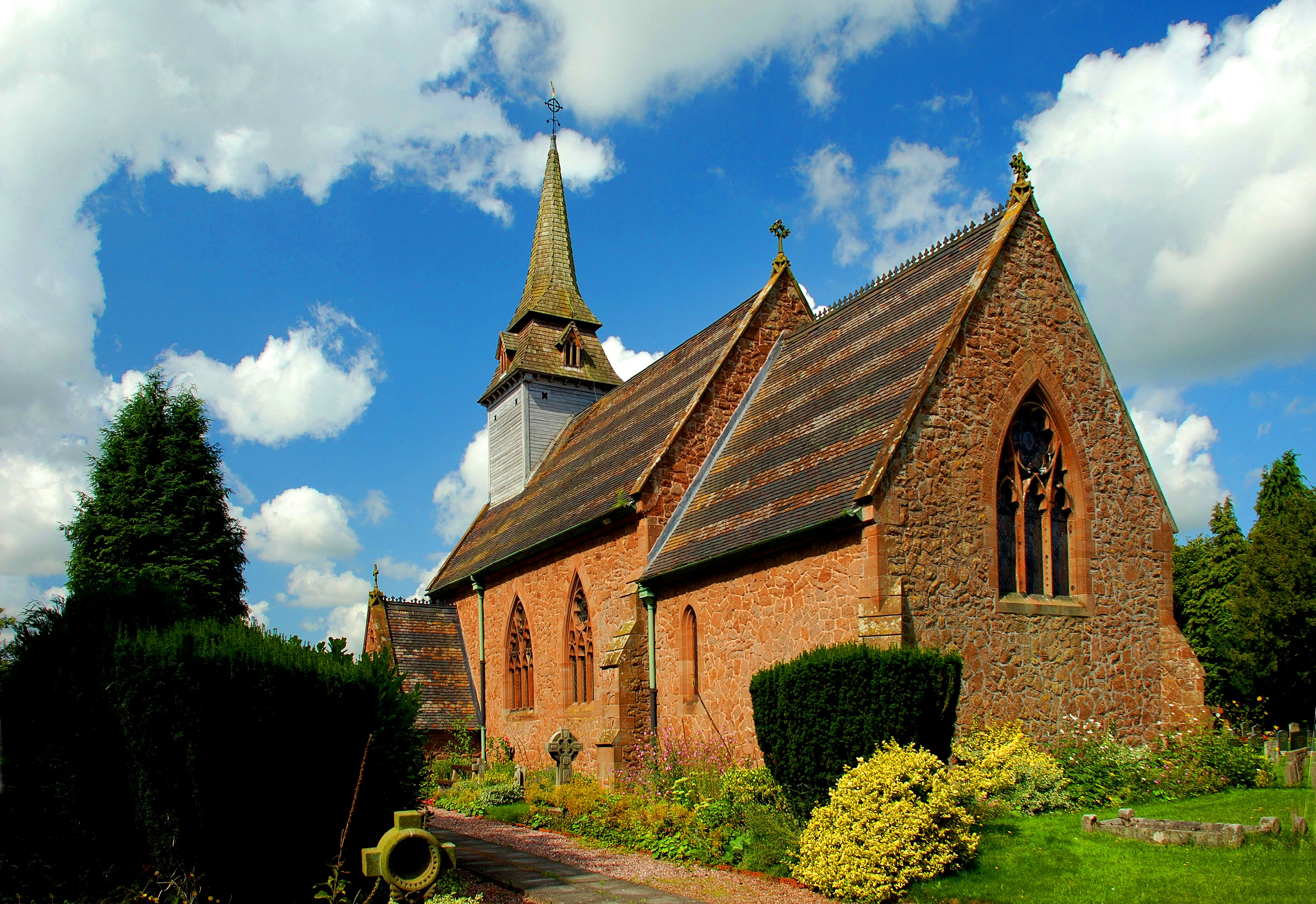
- St Luke's church, Sambrook

- Location within Shropshire
- OS grid reference: SJ712246
- Civil parish: Chetwynd
- Unitary authority: Telford and Wrekin
- Ceremonial county: Shropshire
- Region: West Midlands
- Country: England
- Sovereign state: United Kingdom
- Post town: NEWPORT
- Postcode district: TF10
- Dialling code: 01952
- Police: West Mercia
- Fire: Shropshire
- Ambulance: West Midlands
- UK Parliament: The Wrekin

Sambrook is a small village in the ceremonial county of Shropshire, where it is part of the civil parish of Chetwynd, north of the town of Newport. To the north is the small hamlet of Ellerton, with Howle to the west and Pickstock to the south-east.

It was recorded as a manor in the 1086 Domesday Book survey, when it was known as "Semembre"; the spellings "Sambroc" and "Sambrock" were later used: the name probably means "sand brook".

== Buildings ==
In the village there is an early 18th-century manor house, Sambrook Manor, a public house, the Three Horseshoes, and a mill with a large millpond fed by the Goldstone and Waggs Brooks. The 19th-century village church, St Luke's, was designed by Benjamin Ferrey.

There is another mill, the derelict but Grade II Listed 18th-century Showell Mill, a short distance to the south-east.

== Notable people ==
- James Sutton (born 1983) - TV actor, was living at Sambrook when he began appearing in Hollyoaks.

== See also ==
- Listed buildings in Chetwynd, Shropshire

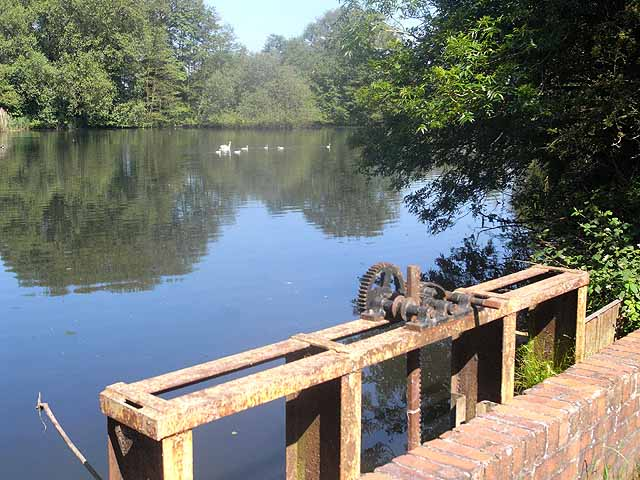
The millpond, dam and sluice gate at Sambrook.
