= Chetwynd, Shropshire =

Civil parish in Shropshire, England

Coordinates: 52°47′19.3″N 2°23′36.6″W

Chetwynd
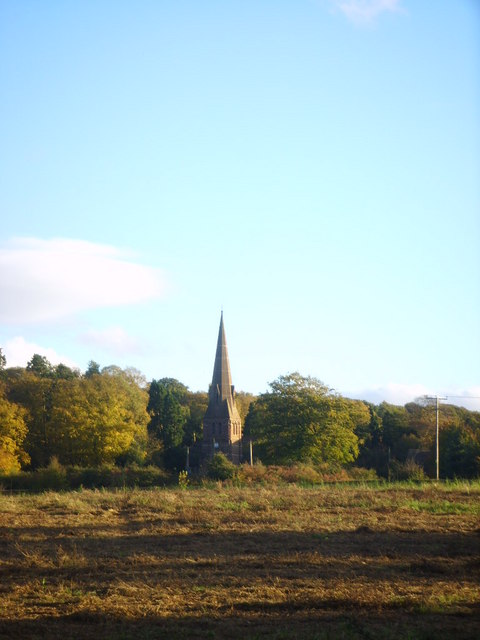
- St Michael and All Angels Church, Chetwynd Park

- Location within Shropshire
- Population: 638 (2021 census)
- Civil parish: Chetwynd
- Unitary authority: Telford and Wrekin
- Ceremonial county: Shropshire
- Region: West Midlands
- Country: England
- Sovereign state: United Kingdom
- Police: West Mercia
- Fire: Shropshire
- Ambulance: West Midlands

Chetwynd is a rural civil parish just to the north of Newport, in the Telford and Wrekin district, in the ceremonial county of Shropshire in England. In 2021 the parish had a population of 638.

Although the parish contains no substantial nucleated settlements it includes the Chetwynd Park estate, in addition to Sambrook, Howle, Pickstock and a number of other small hamlets.

The north-eastern boundary of the parish is formed by an old Roman road, now a country lane, while its eastern boundary runs along the Lonco Brook.

The parish church, dedicated to St. Michael and All Angels, was built in 1865 to the designs of Benjamin Ferrey and contains a fine East window depicting "Christ adored by the hosts of Heaven", designed by John Hardman in 1881. The chancel windows, one of which is a war memorial to parish dead of World War I and designed by Dunstan Powell, are also by Hardman, while the windows in the nave were designed by Francis Skeat in 1963.

An F1/T2 tornado formed within the civil parish on 23 November 1981, as part of the record-breaking nationwide tornado outbreak on that day. The tornado later moved over Newport, causing some damage there.

The former RAF Chetwynd is nearby.

== See also ==
- Listed buildings in Chetwynd, Shropshire
