= Muxton =

Coordinates: 52.720°N 2.421°W

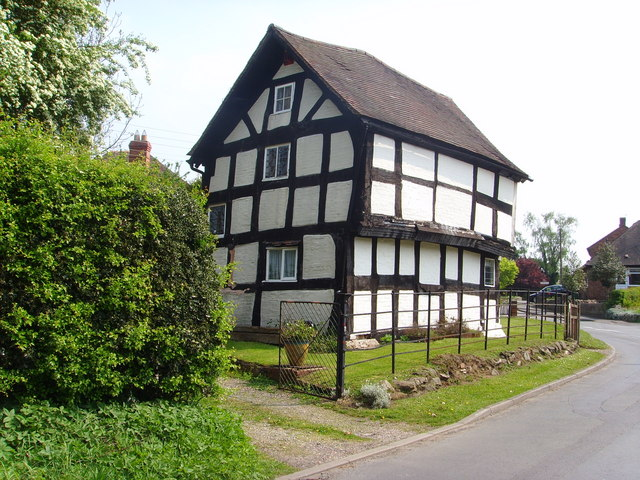
- Tudor house at Muxton

- Location within Shropshire
- Population: 6,557 (2011)
- OS grid reference: SJ715137
- Civil parish: Donnington and Muxton
- Unitary authority: Telford and Wrekin
- Ceremonial county: Shropshire
- Region: West Midlands
- Country: England
- Sovereign state: United Kingdom
- Post town: TELFORD
- Postcode district: TF2
- Dialling code: 01952
- Police: West Mercia
- Fire: Shropshire
- Ambulance: West Midlands
- UK Parliament: The Wrekin

Muxton is a village in the parish of Donnington and Muxton in the Telford and Wrekin borough of Shropshire, England. It situated between the towns of Newport, Oakengates and Telford.

The population was 6,557 as of the 2011 Census, which is a 12.6% increase over that at the previous census, which took place in 2001.

St John's Church, (Church of England), is located in Muxton and together with St. Michael's and all Angels in Lilleshall forms the centre of the Christian community in both parishes. The building of St. John's is also used as a small community centre. There is also the Serbian Orthodox Church's Church of Saint Nicholas.

The Shropshire Golf Centre is near Muxton, situated within the Granville Country Park, which itself lies on the southern edge of the greater Muxton area.

== See also ==
- Listed buildings in Lilleshall and Donnington
