= Pickstock =

Hamlet in Shropshire, England

Coordinates: 52.804°N 2.406°W

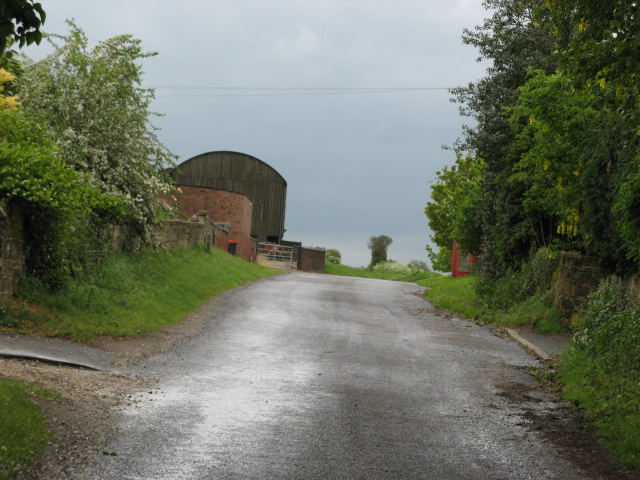
- Minor road through Pickstock, Shropshire

- Location within Shropshire
- OS grid reference: SJ726230
- Civil parish: Chetwynd
- Unitary authority: Telford and Wrekin
- Ceremonial county: Shropshire
- Region: West Midlands
- Country: England
- Sovereign state: United Kingdom
- Post town: NEWPORT
- Postcode district: TF10
- Dialling code: 01952
- Police: West Mercia
- Fire: Shropshire
- Ambulance: West Midlands
- UK Parliament: The Wrekin

Pickstock is a hamlet in the civil parish of Chetwynd, in the Telford and Wrekin district, in the ceremonial county of Shropshire, England. It is near the town of Newport. In 1870-72 the township had a population of 157.

Its name is of Old English origin and may mean "Pices' stoc ("dependent settlement")". Situated in an isolated rural area, it was an outlying township of the manor, and later parish, of Edgmond.

Pickstock is south-east of the village of Sambrook and the River Meese (where there was once a watermill) runs nearby. The Pickstock Cross, the stump of an old preaching cross of unknown age, lies in a private garden in the village.

== See also ==
- Listed buildings in Chetwynd, Shropshire
