= Listed buildings in Cheswardine =

Cheswardine is a civil parish in Shropshire, England. It contains 21 listed buildings that are recorded in the National Heritage List for England. Of these, one is listed at Grade II*, the middle of the three grades, and the others are at Grade II, the lowest grade. The parish includes the village of Cheswardine, and smaller settlements including Ellerton, and is otherwise rural. The Shropshire Union Canal passes through the parish, and associated with his are eleven listed buildings, namely eight bridges and three mileposts. The other listed buildings are a church and associated structures, a watermill, a country house, and smaller houses and farmhouses.

== Key ==
Grade	Criteria
II*	Particularly important buildings of more than special interest
II	Buildings of national importance and special interest

== Buildings ==
Name and location	Photograph	Date	Notes	Grade
St Swithun's Church; 52.86592°N 2.41841°W		13th century	The oldest part of the church is the north chapel, which has been relocated, the tower dates from the 15th century, and the rest of the church was rebuilt in 1886–89 by J. L. Pearson in Geometrical style. The church is built in red sandstone with tile roofs, and consists of a nave with a clerestory, north and south aisles, a south porch, a chancel with a south vestry and organ chamber, a north chapel, and a west tower. The tower has three stages, a west doorway and window, a clock face on the south side, and at the top is a quatrefoil frieze, gargoyles, and a coped embattled parapet with crocketed corner pinnacles, and a weathervane. The chapel is in Early English style.	II*
Soudley Park Farmhouse; 52.84813°N 2.40187°W	—	Mid 17th century	The farmhouse was altered in the 19th century. It is timber framed with brick nogging on a sandstone plinth, and has a slate roof. The farmhouse consists of a hall range with two bays, and a cross-wing of two bays. There are two storeys, the upper storey jettied with a moulded bressumer, and the windows are casements.	II
The Old Hall; 52.86614°N 2.41793°W	—	Mid 18th century	A house that was extended in the 19th century, and has been subdivided. It is in red brick on a chamfered stone plinth, with sandstone dressings and a tile roof. There are two storeys with attics, and an H-shaped plan with projecting gabled wings. The windows are cross-windows with gauged brick heads and keystones. There is a porch with a hipped roof, steps with a balustrade, and a doorway with an architrave, a fluted frieze, and a moulded cornice.	II
Ellerton Mill; 52.83050°N 2.42583°W	—	Late 18th century	A watermill in red brick on a red sandstone plinth, with a dentil eaves cornice and a tile roof. There are two storeys and a loft. The windows and doorway have segmental heads, and in the south gable end are three dovecote openings. To the west is a cast iron overshot double-width waterwheel with a header tank.	II
Chest tomb 52.86607°N 2.41884°W	—	c. 1800	The chest tomb is in the churchyard of St Swithun's Church. It is in red sandstone and has an oval plan. On the tomb are reeded pilaster strips, incised panels, and a moulded cornice. On the octagonal top is an oval-shaped flaming urn finial, and a reeded bowl with swags and winged angels.	II
Hanwood Farmhouse; 52.85429°N 2.40760°W	—	Early 19th century	The farmhouse is in red brick on a chamfered red sandstone plinth, and has a tile roof. There are three storeys, three bays, and two two-storey gabled wings at the rear. The central doorway has reeded pilasters strips, a radial fanlight, and an open triangular pediment. The windows are sashes.	II
The Round House; 52.82706°N 2.41655°W		Early 19th century	A former lodge to Ellerton Hall, it is in red sandstone, and has a slate roof resting on posts at the corners. The lodge has an octagonal plan and two storeys. The windows are casementss, those in the upper floor are octagonal. The doorway has a plain surround.	II
Westcott Mill Farmhouse; 52.85704°N 2.43325°W	—	Early 19th century	The farmhouse is in red brick on a red sandstone plinth, with a dentil eaves cornice, and a tile roof with coped and parapeted gables. There are three storeys and an L-shaped plan, with a front of three bays, and a rear wing. The doorway has reeded pilaster strips, a radial fanlight, and a moulded cornice on consoles, and the windows are sashes.	II
Bridge No. 48 (Park Heath Bridge); 52.84450°N 2.40025°W		c. 1830	The bridge carries a road over the Shropshire Union Canal, it is in sandstone and consists of a single elliptical arch. The bridge has voussoirs, flush keystones, string courses, parapets with rounded coping, and square end piers. The abutments are curved, and there are grooves on the cast iron corner posts on the towpath side.	II
Bridge No. 49 (Hazeldines Bridge); 52.84415°N 2.40542°W		c. 1830	An accommodation bridge over the Shropshire Union Canal, it is in sandstone and consists of a single elliptical arch with a humped-back shape. The bridge has voussoirs, flush keystones, string courses, parapets with rounded coping, and square end piers. The abutments are curved, and there are grooves on the cast iron corner posts on the towpath side.	II
Bridge No. 50 (Soudley Bridge); 52.84426°N 2.41169°W		c. 1830	An accommodation bridge over the Shropshire Union Canal, it is in sandstone and consists of a single elliptical arch with a humped-back shape. The bridge has voussoirs, flush keystones, string courses, parapets with rounded coping, and square end piers. The abutments are curved, and there are grooves on the cast iron corner posts on the towpath side.	II
Bridge No. 51 (New Brighton Bridge); 52.84682°N 2.41630°W		c. 1830	The bridge carries a track over the Shropshire Union Canal, it is in sandstone and consists of a single skew elliptical arch. The bridge has voussoirs, flush keystones, string courses, parapets with rounded coping, and square end piers. The abutments are curved, and there are grooves on the cast iron corner posts on the towpath side.	II
Bridge No. 52 (Fox Bridge); 52.85067°N 2.42223°W		c. 1830	The bridge carries a road over the Shropshire Union Canal, it is in sandstone and consists of a single elliptical arch with a humped-back shape. The bridge has voussoirs, flush keystones, string courses, parapets with rounded coping, and square end piers. The abutments are curved, and there are grooves on the cast iron corner posts on the towpath side.	II
Bridge No. 53 (Hallemans Bridge); 52.85519°N 2.42666°W		c. 1830	The bridge carries a Westcott Lane over the Shropshire Union Canal, it is in sandstone and consists of a single elliptical arch. The bridge has voussoirs, flush keystones, string courses, parapets with rounded coping, and square end piers. The abutments are curved, and there are grooves on the cast iron corner posts on the towpath side.	II
Bridge No. 54 (Westcottmill Bridge); 52.85067°N 2.42223°W		c. 1830	An accommodation bridge over the Shropshire Union Canal, it is in sandstone and consists of a single elliptical arch. The bridge has voussoirs, flush keystones, string courses, parapets with rounded coping, and square end piers. The abutments are curved, and there are grooves on the cast iron corner posts on the towpath side.	II
Bridge No. 55 (Goldstone Bridge); 52.86146°N 2.43914°W		c. 1830	The bridge carries a road over the Shropshire Union Canal, it is in sandstone and consists of a single elliptical arch. The bridge has voussoirs, flush keystones, string courses, parapets with rounded coping, and square end piers. The abutments are curved, and there are grooves on the cast iron corner posts on the towpath side.	II
Milepost near Park Heath; 52.84429°N 2.40274°W		c. 1830	The milepost is on the towpath on the south side of the Shropshire Union Canal. It is in cast iron, and has a cylindrical post and three curved rectangular plates inscribed with the distances in miles to Autherley Junction, Nantwich, and Norbury Junction.	II
Mile post near Fox Bridge; 52.85043°N 2.42202°W		c. 1830	The milepost is on the towpath on the southwest side of the Shropshire Union Canal. It is in cast iron, and has a cylindrical post and three curved rectangular plates inscribed with the distances in miles to Autherley Junction, Nantwich, and Norbury Junction.	II
Mile post near Goldstone Bridge; 52.86079°N 2.43777°W	—	c. 1830	The milepost is on the towpath on the southwest side of the Shropshire Union Canal. It is in cast iron, and has a cylindrical post and three curved rectangular plates inscribed with the distances in miles to Autherley Junction, Nantwich, and Norbury Junction.	II
Cheswardine Hall; 52.87401°N 2.40987°W		1875	A country house in red brick with stone dressings, quoins, bands, and tiled roofs. There are two storeys and attics, and an irregular gabled front. On the front is a four-storey tower containing a porch with pairs of unfluted Doric columns and a parapet. Above this is a bowed oriel window, and at the top is a balustraded parapet. The windows are mullioned and transomed. The forecourt is enclosed by brick walls that have piers with finials.	II
Churchyard steps 52.86576°N 2.41845°W	—	c. 1888–89	The flight of 13 steps, designed by J. L. Pearson, is to the south of St Swithun's Church, leading to the porch. They are in red sandstone, and have chamfered coping, ramped up to the porch. At the bottom is a cast iron overthrow, probably from a later date, with cresting and a lamp, and there is a pair of wooden gates.	II
