= Woodcote Hall =

House in Shropshire, England

Coordinates: 52.7364°N 2.3463°W

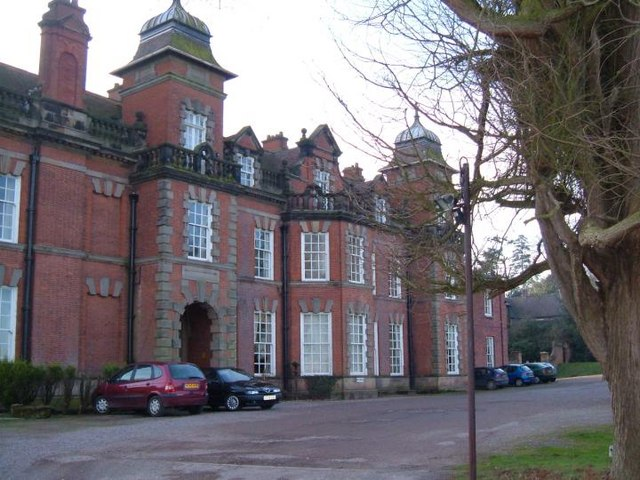

Woodcote Hall is a house built in 1875, in use as a nursing home, situated on the edge of Newport, Shropshire, England, on the Staffordshire border. It is grade II listed.

== House ==
It was until the early 20th century the seat of the Cotes family, and already by 1752 to have been set in well-established grounds. Those grounds, and Woodcote Hall, are shown in a fine portrait of John Cotes, MP (d.1821). A park, however, may not have been established until 1808.

Hannah Cullwick worked as a kitchen scullion at Woodcote for at least a small period of time around Christmas of 1854. Her sister Ellen is also known to have worked there as a servant.

The house was rebuilt in 1875 by F. P. Cockerell after the 18th-century mansion was destroyed by fire. There are remains of the original house at the north-west and south-west sides and there are vestiges of 17th-century fabric at the rear (south), one room contains fireplaces with inscription "T. C. 1767" and stopped and chamfered ceiling beams. 'T. C.' stands for Thomas Cotes. Also a small stone-rubble rear wing with stopped and chamfered ceiling beam and tiebeam roof truss with angle struts. The 1875 rebuild is in a Jacobean/Queen Anne style had brick with stone dressings and tiled roof. Traces of the former house were still discernible c. 1882 (O.S. 6, I.SW (1887); VII.NW (1891)).

The estate was sold out of the Cotes family to Captain James Foster (1853–1927), who had previously leased the house and lived there many years. The hall continued to be occupied as a private house until after the death of his surviving sister. It was bought for £20,000 in 1949 for use by the Roman Catholic Congregation of the Sacred Heart Fathers (Dehonians), SCJs as a junior seminary, opening with students moved from outgrown premises in Earl Shilton and 40 new students from elsewhere. The greater part of its student intake were from southern Ireland until education changes in their country in the 1960s reduced the rolls (from a peak of 80 boys a year) and caused the seminary to be closed in 1972. The order ran the house as a retreat or recreational centre particularly for youth, until they sold it in 1981. The hall, with its chapel and all outbuildings, was developed into residential flats, a restaurant and a leisure centre but a few years later it was converted into a residential nursing home for old people.

In 1957 the Sacred Heart Fathers built a new chapel on the former tennis courts to sit 150 boys, holding seven separate oratories and a spacious sacristy. In 1988 this chapel was converted into an adjunct of the medical centre of the residential home.

== St Peter's Chapel ==
The 12th-century redundant chapel of St Peter is within the grounds, to the east of the southern corner of the hall. It is grade II* listed, although NHLE's listing refers to it as "Parish Church (chapel)" and says "Dedication unknown". The Church of England's Church Heritage Register states that it is not listed, but refers to it as "Woodcote: St Peter". Maps in both listings confirm that they refer to the same building. The parish council's website refers to the church as "8th-century", while the Corpus of Romanesque Sculpture in Britain and Ireland suggests "a date in the 1180s". The churchyard includes one grave of a World War I soldier in the care of the Commonwealth War Graves Commission.

== Grounds ==
In 1752 avenues ran north-east and south-east from the Hall to the road bounding the grounds. By 1827 the grounds had been imparked. The park was well wooded with large numbers of clumps of trees, especially in its southern part, Woodcote Hill. Running between Woodcote Hall and Woodcote Hill was a series of fish ponds.

By 1882 the park had been extended east of the Newport-Albrighton road and a lodge had been built at its southern extremity. The Hall was surrounded by extensive gardens, remarked upon in 1851, notably to the south where there were large, walled kitchen gardens. In the mid-19th century there were also lavish formal pleasure gardens, and a photograph of c.1860 shows intricate geometric cutwork beds or parterre set in gravel walks (S.R.O. 4688)<1>The park was studied in greater detail by Paul Stamper in c 1995.

The southerly avenue was located on the ground during the survey, preserved as the trackway illustrated in the same position as the avenue on the 1st Edition OS Map of 1891.

== See also ==
- Listed buildings in Chetwynd Aston and Woodcote
