= Howle, Shropshire =

Village in Shropshire, England

Coordinates: 52.807°N 2.459°W

Howle
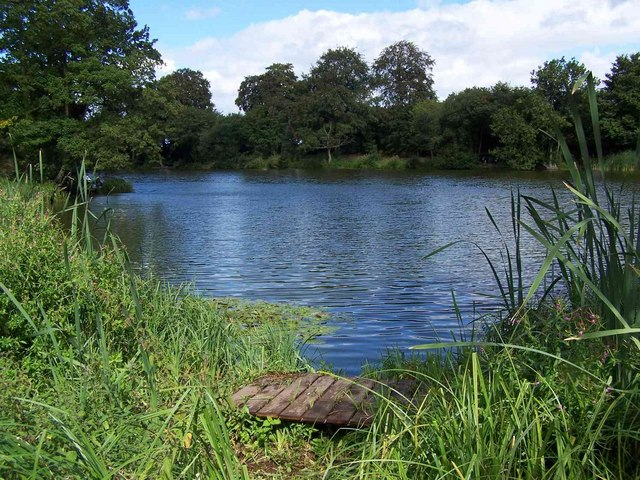
- Howle Pool, at Howle Pool Farm, Howle, Shropshire

- Location within Shropshire
- OS grid reference: SJ690234
- Civil parish: Chetwynd
- Unitary authority: Telford and Wrekin
- Ceremonial county: Shropshire
- Region: West Midlands
- Country: England
- Sovereign state: United Kingdom
- Post town: NEWPORT
- Postcode district: TF10
- Dialling code: 01952
- Police: West Mercia
- Fire: Shropshire
- Ambulance: West Midlands
- UK Parliament: The Wrekin

Howle, also spelt Howl, is a small village in Shropshire, England, in a rural area some five miles to the north-west of the town of Newport. Although it is part of the civil parish of Chetwynd, the nearest village is Child's Ercall.

The village name has been variously suggested as being derived from the Old English personal name element Hyge- or from a word meaning "hill". In the Domesday Book survey it was recorded as the manor of Hugle.

Howle is on the edge of Ercall Heath, which was largely forested until World War I and has been partly brought into cultivation since; the River Meese flows nearby. There is a holy well, formerly used by those seeking cures, south of Howle near the road to Tibberton.

== See also ==
- Listed buildings in Chetwynd, Shropshire
