= Ellerton, Shropshire =

Hamlet in Shropshire, England

Coordinates: 52.829°N 2.423°W

Ellerton
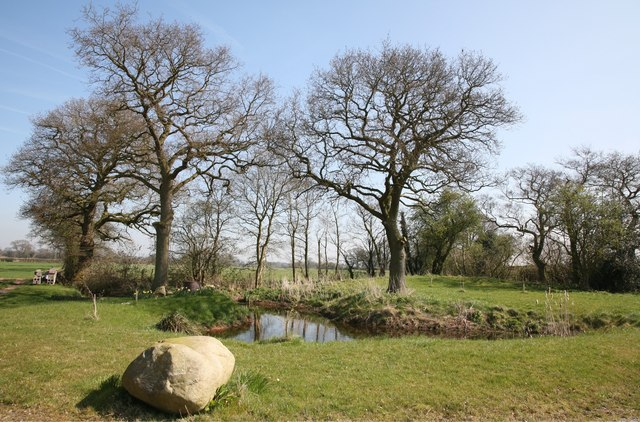
- Pool near Ellerton Wood, north of Ellerton, Shropshire

- Location within Shropshire
- OS grid reference: SJ715258
- Civil parish: Cheswardine
- Unitary authority: Shropshire
- Ceremonial county: Shropshire
- Region: West Midlands
- Country: England
- Sovereign state: United Kingdom
- Post town: NEWPORT
- Postcode district: TF10
- Dialling code: 01952
- Police: West Mercia
- Fire: Shropshire
- Ambulance: West Midlands
- UK Parliament: North Shropshire

Ellerton is a small hamlet in Shropshire, England. It lies in a rather isolated rural area several miles north of the town of Newport, close to the village of Sambrook, and is part of the civil parish of Cheswardine. Its name may be derived from the Old English alor (alder), and tun (farm or enclosure); "the farm at the alder tree".

The hamlet is clustered around Ellerton Hall, an early 19th-century manor built on the site of an earlier house. Next to the road is a large millpond fed by the Goldstone Brook, with a derelict waterwheel. King Charles I was supposed to have drunk from a well here, later known as the King's Well. The well is still located by the side of a lane to the east of Ellerton hamlet, near the Kingswell Cottages.

== See also ==
- Listed buildings in Cheswardine
