= Woodcote, Shropshire =

Hamlet in Shropshire, England

Coordinates: 52.734127°N 2.344356°W

Woodcote
- Hamlet
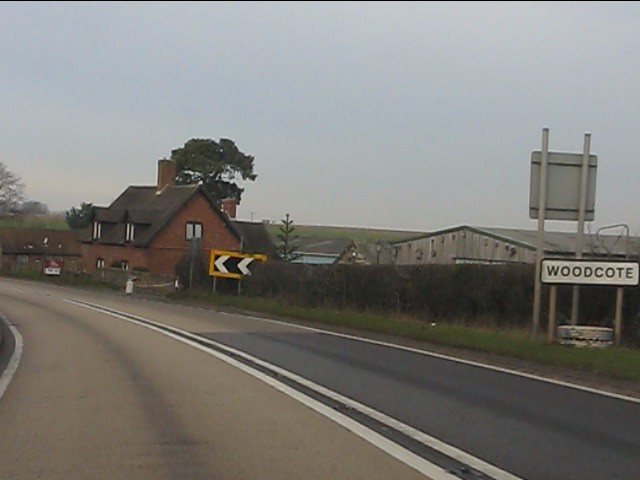
- Woodcote

- Location within Shropshire
- OS grid reference: SJ766148
- Civil parish: Chetwynd Aston and Woodcote
- Unitary authority: Telford and Wrekin
- Ceremonial county: Shropshire
- Region: West Midlands
- Country: England
- Sovereign state: United Kingdom
- Post town: NEWPORT
- Postcode district: TF10
- Dialling code: 01952
- Police: West Mercia
- Fire: Shropshire
- Ambulance: West Midlands
- UK Parliament: The Wrekin

Woodcote is a hamlet in the civil parish of Chetwynd Aston and Woodcote, in the Telford and Wrekin district, in the ceremonial county of Shropshire, England. It is located between the towns of Shifnal and Newport.

== History ==
The settlement of Udecote is recorded in the Domesday Book of 1086. A family known as the "Cotes" owned land around the modern day hamlet. Woodcote was formerly a chapelry in the parish of Sheriff-Hales. In 1866 Woodcote became a separate civil parish. It was transferred along with neighbouring villages and nearby Newport into the wider Telford and Wrekin borough in the 1960s–70s. In 1971 the parish had a population of 136. On 1 April 1988 the parish was abolished and merged with Chetwynd Aston.

== Geography ==
It is located on the A41 road between Newport and Albrighton and is close to the M54 motorway between Shrewsbury, Telford and Wolverhampton.

== Woodcote Hall ==
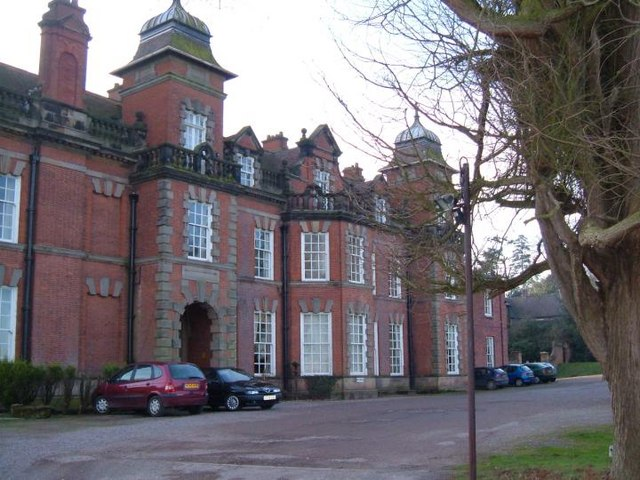
Woodcote Hall, now a nursing home

Woodcote Hall was home to the Cotes family until the 20th century. It was rebuilt and is now a nursing home. It is a Grade II listed building.

== St Peter's Chapel ==
Within the grounds of Woodcote Hall is the Grade II* listed St Peter's Chapel, declared redundant in 2003.

== Transport ==
No bus services operate in Woodcote; the nearest are in Weston Heath between Shifnal and Bridgnorth and in Newport.
