= Telford and Wrekin =

Borough in Shropshire, England

Telford and Wrekin Telford
- Unitary authority area and borough
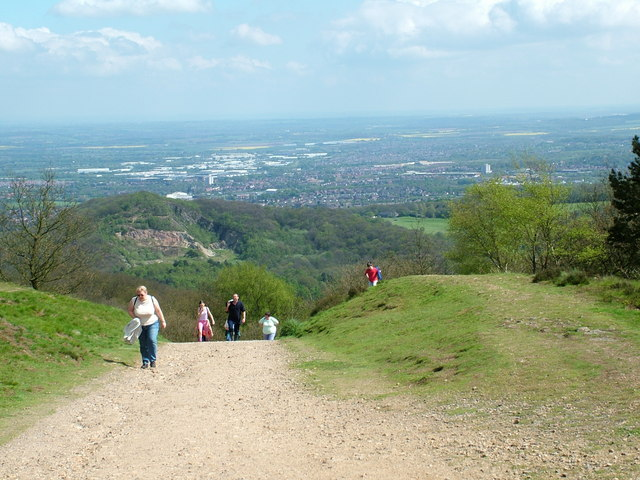
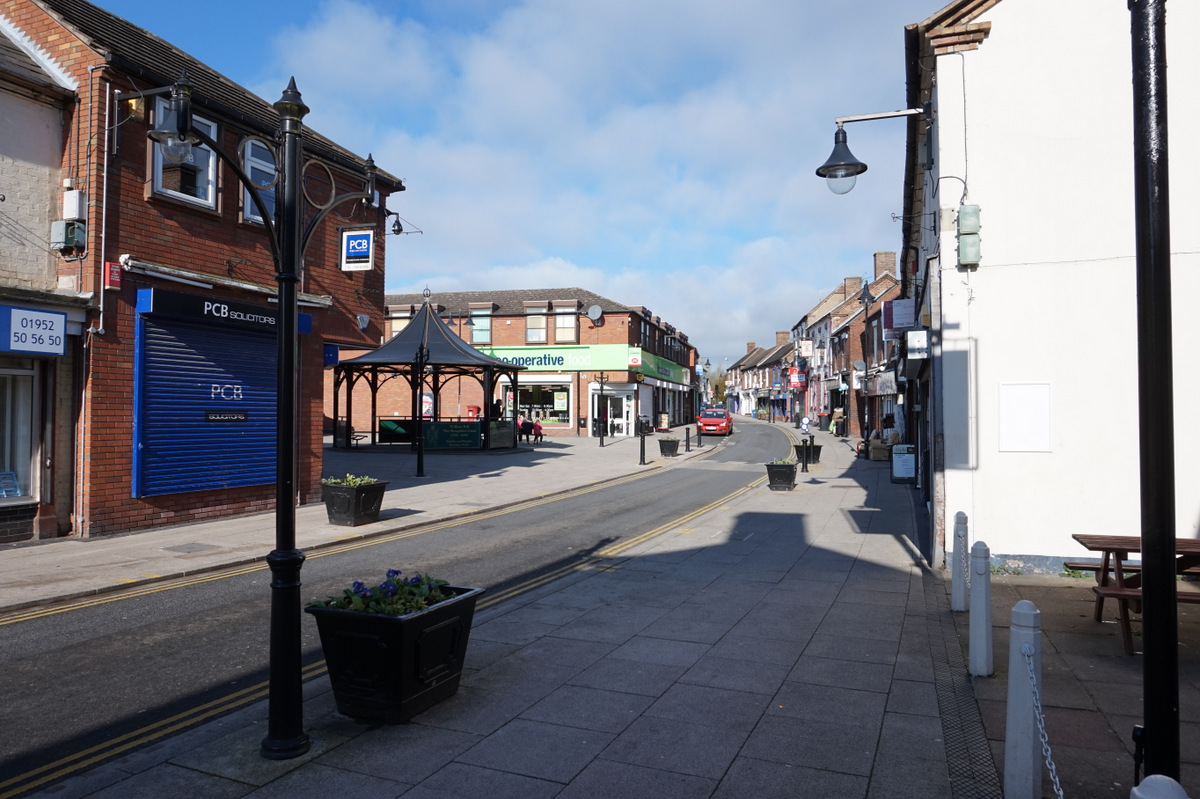
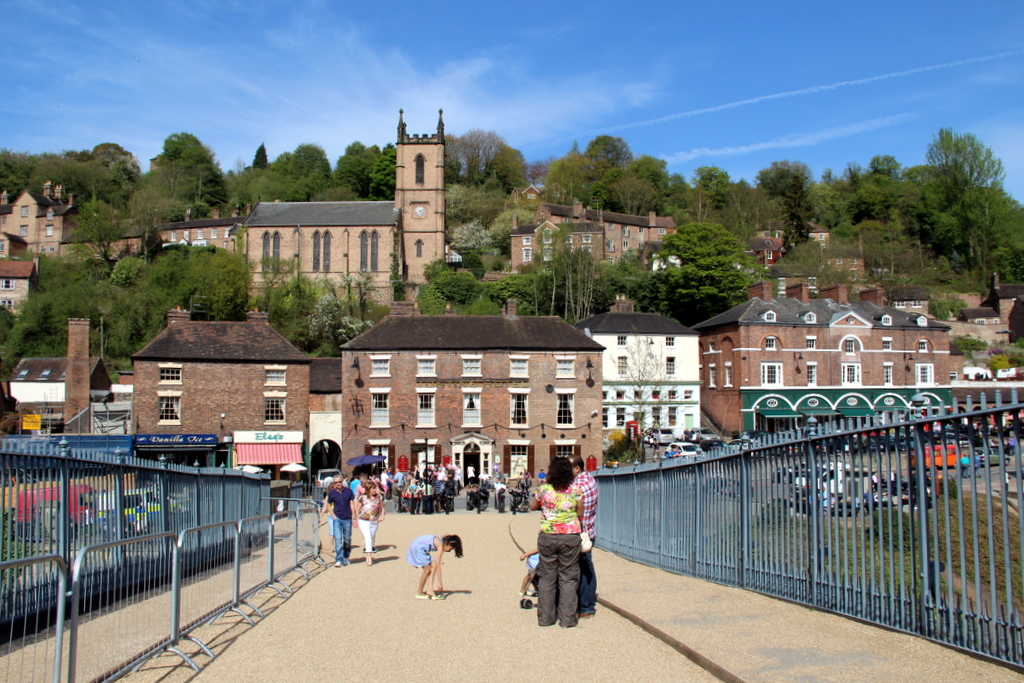
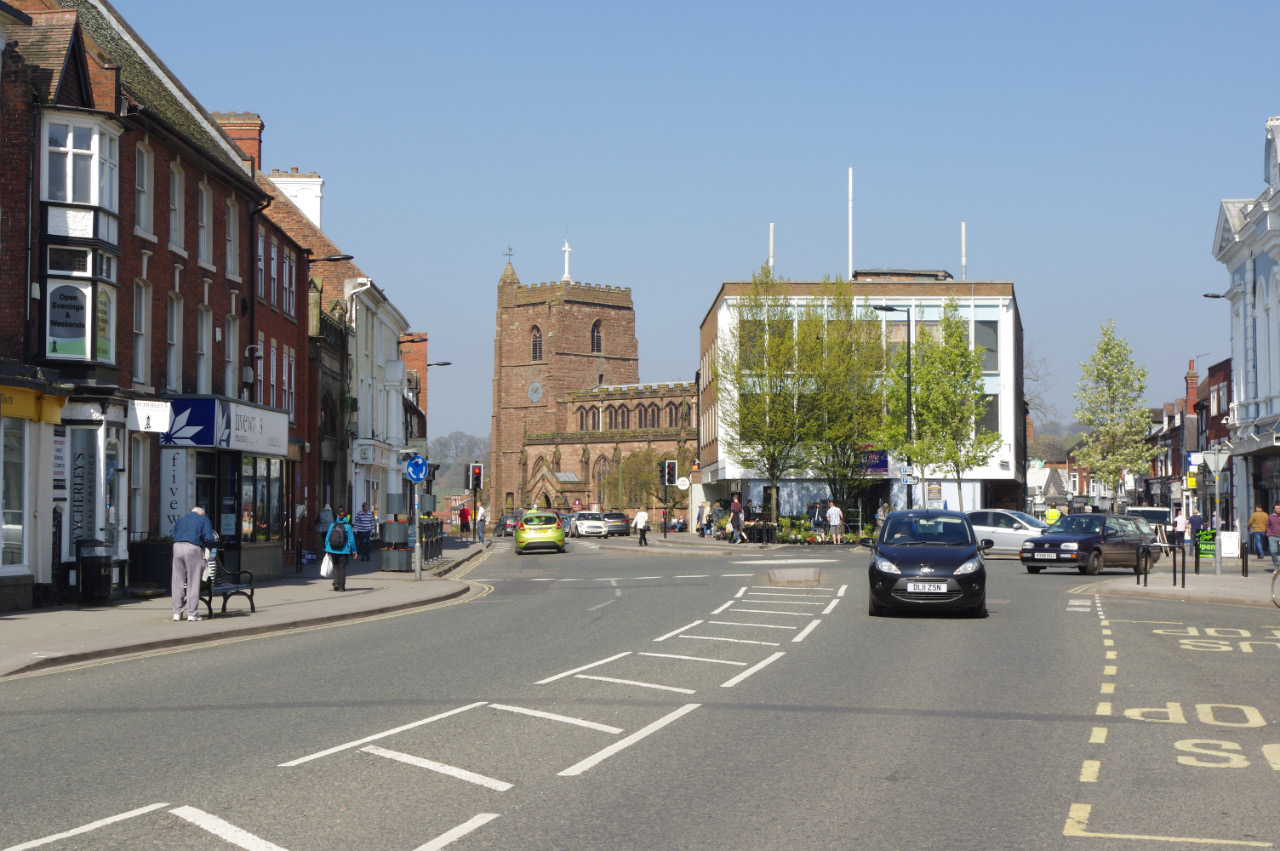
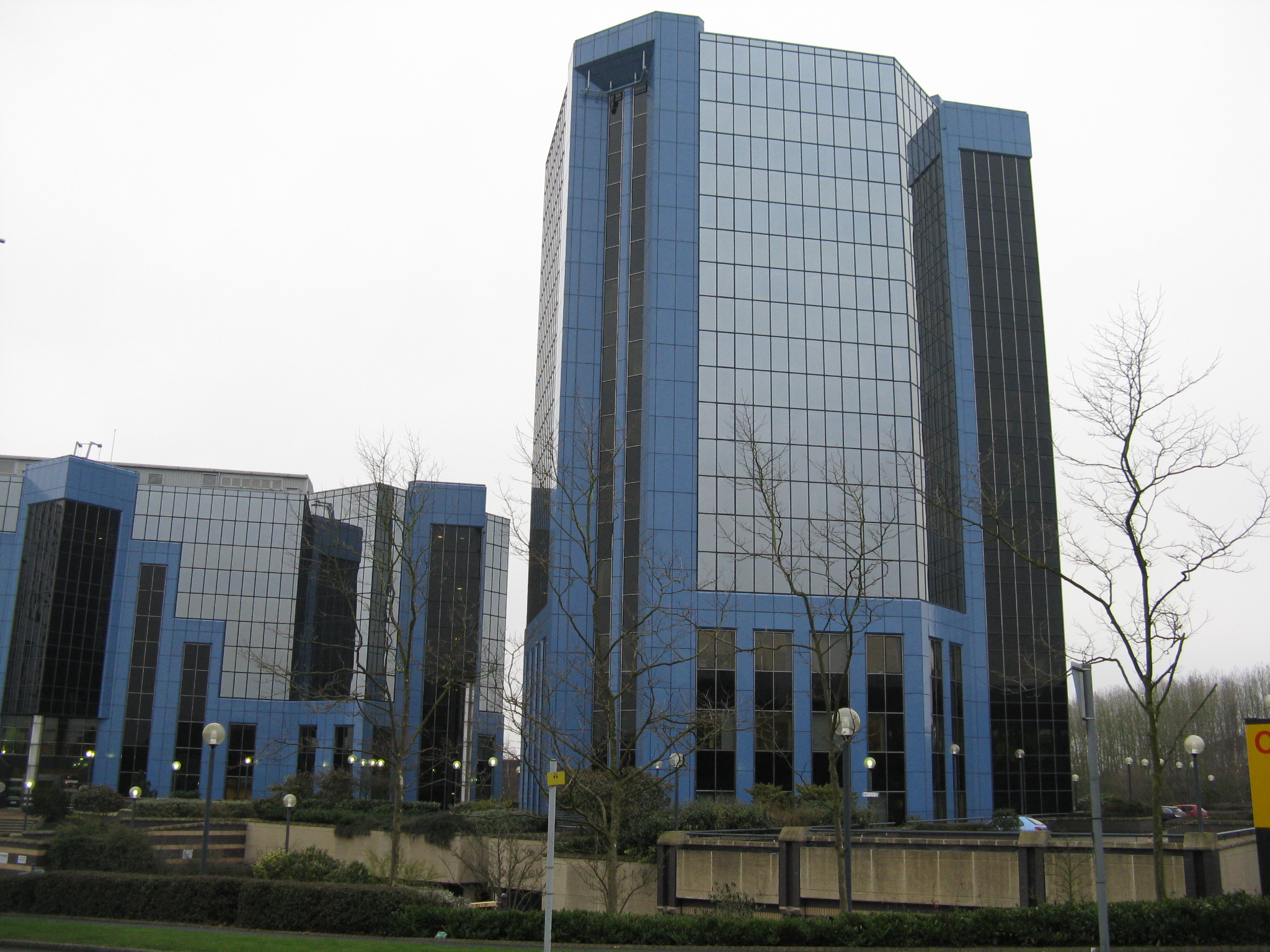
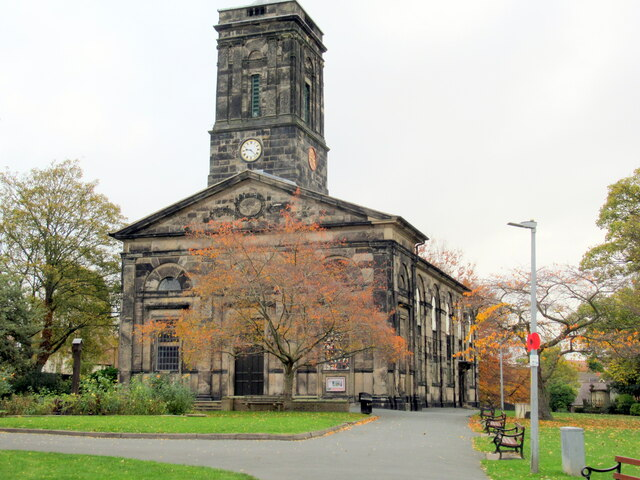
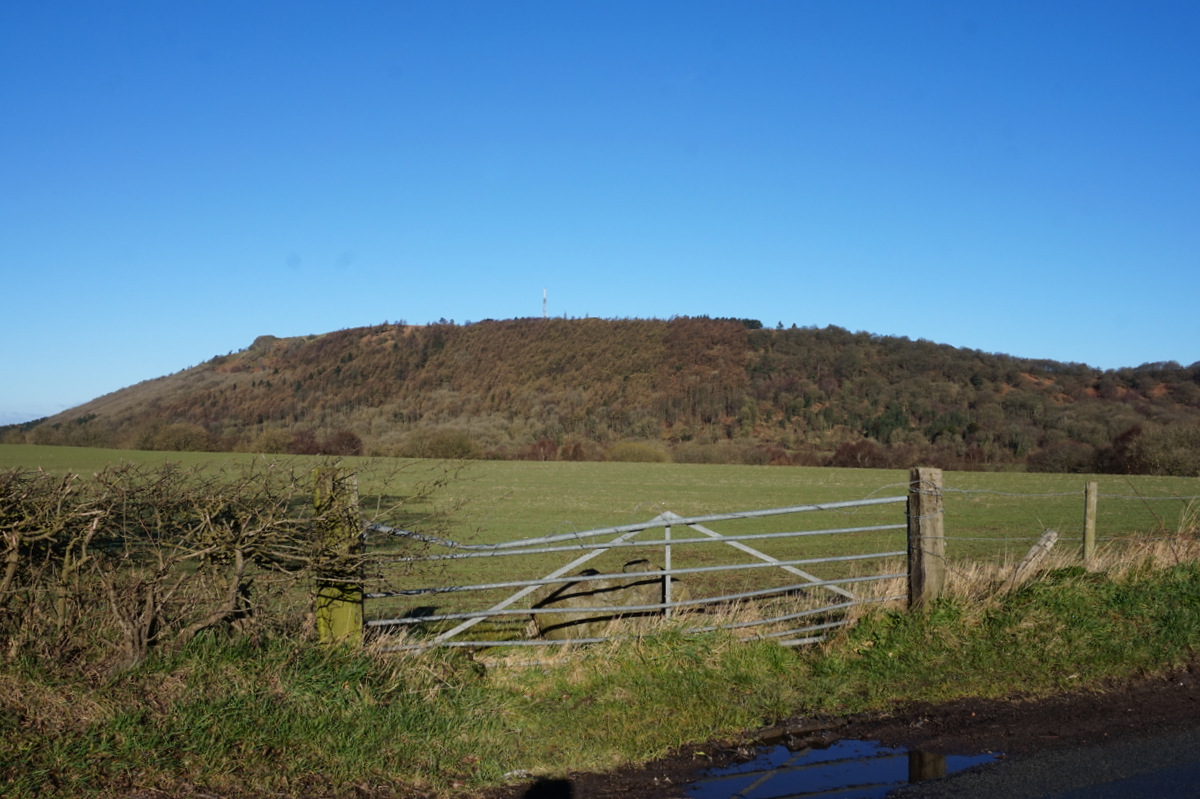
- From left to right; Top: Telford and Shropshire Plain from Wrekin; Middle 1st: Dawley and Ironbridge; Middle 2nd: Newport and Telford Plaza; Bottom: All Saints Church in Wellington and the Wrekin

- Flag

- Shown within Shropshire
- Interactive map of Telford and Wrekin
- Coordinates: 52°40′52″N 2°26′19″W
- Country: United Kingdom
- Region: West Midlands
- County: Shropshire
- Admin HQ: Telford
- Established: 1998

Government
  - Type: Non-metropolitan district
  - Local Authority: Telford and Wrekin Council

Area
  - Total: 290.31 km^{2} (112.09 sq mi)

Population
  - Total: 185,600
  - Density: 639.3/km^{2} (1,656/sq mi)

Ethnicity (2021)
  - Ethnic groups: List: 88.2% White; 5.4% Asian; 2.6% Mixed; 2.9% Black; 0.9% other

Religion (2021)
  - Religion: List: 47.6% Christianity; 40.9% no religion; 2.7% Islam; 0.7% Hinduism; 0.1% Judaism; 1.5% Sikhism; 0.3% Buddhism; 0.5% other; 5.6% not stated
- Time zone: GMT
- Postal code: TF
- ISO 3166 code: GB-TFW
- Website: telford.gov.uk

Telford and Wrekin is a borough and unitary authority in Shropshire, England. In 1974, a non-metropolitan district of Shropshire was created called the Wrekin, named after a prominent hill to the west of Telford. In 1998, the district became a unitary authority and was renamed "Telford and Wrekin", which remains part of the Shropshire ceremonial county and shares institutions such as the Fire and Rescue Service and Community Health with the rest the county.

The borough's major settlement is Telford, which was designated a new town in the 1960s and incorporated the towns of Dawley, Madeley, Oakengates, and Wellington. After the Telford conurbation, which includes the aforementioned towns, the next-largest settlement is Newport which is located in the northeast of the borough and is not part of the original new town of Telford. The borough borders Staffordshire, but is surrounded by the unitary district of Shropshire which covers the area previously administered by Shropshire County Council.

== History ==
The district was created on 1 April 1974 under the Local Government Act 1972 covering the area of five former districts, plus a small part of a sixth:

- Dawley Urban District
- Newport Urban District
- Oakengates Urban District
- Wellington Rural District
- Wellington Urban District
- From Shifnal Rural District, the part of the parish of Shifnal within the designated area of Telford New Town (which was added to the parish of Lilleshall)

The district was initially called "Wrekin", but during 1974 the council changed the name to "The Wrekin". A significant part of the new district was within the designated area of the Telford New Town, which had been initially designated in 1963 as Dawley New Town before being enlarged and renamed to Telford in 1968. The Telford Development Corporation existed alongside the elected councils until it was wound up in 1991, running various functions such as town planning which would otherwise have been council responsibilities.

On 1 April 1998, as a result of the Local Government Commission for England's review, the district became a unitary authority, independent from Shropshire County Council. On the same day the district's name was changed from "The Wrekin" to "Telford and Wrekin".

All of the council houses previously owned by Wrekin District Council and the subsequent Telford and Wrekin Council were transferred to a newly created housing association, the Wrekin Housing Trust, in 1999 which now owns the majority of social housing in Telford.

Telford and Wrekin applied unsuccessfully for city status in 2000. The district was granted borough status in 2002.

=== Wards ===
As of 2025, the borough is divided into 32 wards for the election of 54 councillors.

1. Admaston and Bratton; 2. Apley Castle; 3. Arleston; 4. Brookside; 5. Church Aston and Lilleshall; 6. College; 7. Dawley and Aqueduct; 8. Donnington; 9. Dothill; 10. Edgmond and Ercall Magna; 11. Ercall; 12. Hadley and Leegomery; 13. Haygate; 14. Horsehay and Lightmoor; 15. Ironbridge Gorge; 16. Ketley and Overdale; 17. Madeley and Sutton Hill; 18. Malinslee and Dawley Bank; 19. Muxton; 20. Newport North and West; 21. Newport South and East; 22. Oakengates and Ketley Bank; 23. Park; 24. Priorslee; 25. Shawbirch; 26. St Georges; 27. The Nedge; 28. Woodside; 29. Wrockwardine; 30. Wrockwardine Wood and Trench

=== Election history ===
Borough elections are held every 4 years.

- Telford and Wrekin Council elections

== Governance ==
Telford and Wrekin operates a cabinet-style council. It has 54 elected councillors who appoint the seven cabinet members, including the leader, each year. The cabinet members make decisions as a whole and meet every two weeks.

Telford and Wrekin is currently a Labour controlled council.

== Policing ==
Telford and Wrekin is part of the West Mercia Police police area. The force is based in Worcester (outside Shropshire) and the borough's area is a Territorial Policing Unit in the force's organisation.

== Towns, villages and other settlements ==
Map of civil parishes in Telford and Wrekin

The main towns of the borough are: Coalbrookdale, Dawley, Madeley, Newport, Oakengates, Telford and Wellington. The table below shows the civil parishes of the borough and their respective settlements:

#	Civil parish	Settlements in the parish	Population
1	Chetwynd	Chetwynd, Howle, Pickstock and Sambrook	638
2	Chetwynd Aston and Woodcote	Chetwynd Aston, Pave Lane and Woodcote	674
3	Church Aston	Cheswell, Church Aston and Longford	1,260
4	Dawley Hamlets	Aqueduct, Doseley, Horsehay, Lightmoor, Little Dawley and Spring Village	8,008
5	Donnington and Muxton	Donnington, Donnington Wood and Muxton	13,950
6	Edgmond	Adeney and Edgmond	2,033
7	Ercall Magna	Cold Hatton, Ellerdine, High Ercall, Osbaston, Roden and Rowton	1,810
8	Eyton upon the Weald Moors	Eyton Upon The Weald Moors	N/A
9	Great Dawley	Dawley and Malinslee	12.134
10	Hadley and Leegomery	Apley Castle, Hadley and Leegomery	16,188
11	Hollinswood and Randlay	Hollinswood and Randlay	6,132
12	Ketley	Beveley, Ketley and Red Lake	5,270
13	Kynnersley	Kynnersley	300
14	Lawley and Overdale	Dawley Bank, Lawley, Newdale, Old Park and The Rock	12,173
15	Lilleshall	Lilleshall and Pave Lane	1,370
16	Madeley	Hill Top, Madeley, Sutton Hill and Woodside	18,774
17	Newport	Chetwynd End, Lower Bar and Newport	12,922
18	Oakengates	Beveley, Hollyhurst, Ketley Bank, Oakengates and Wombridge	9,012
19	Preston upon the Weald Moors	Kinley and Preston upon the Weald Moors	204
20	Rodington	Isombridge, Longdon-on-Tern and Rodington	883
21	St George's and Priorslee	Central Park, Priorslee, Redhill, Snedshill and St George's	12,372
22	Stirchley and Brookside	Brookside and Stirchley	10,446
23	The Gorge	Coalbrookdale, Coalport, Ironbridge, Jackfield, Preens Eddy and The Werps	3,803
24	Tibberton and Cherrington	Cherrington and Tibberton	940
25	Waters Upton	Crudgington, Great Bolas and Waters Upton	949
26	Wellington	Dothill, Shawbirch and Wellington	22,881
27	Wrockwardine	Admaston, Allscott, Aston, Bratton, Leaton, Nash, Walcot and Wrockwardine	4,182
28	Wrockwardine Wood and Trench	Trench and Wrockwardine Wood	5,642

== Demography ==
Ethnic Group	2001 census		2011 census		2021 census	
Ethnic Group	Number	%	Number	%	Number	%
White: Total	150,014	94.8%	154,415	92.7%	163,638	88.2%
White: British	147,314	93%	149,096		153,936	83%
White: Irish	1,061		729		723	
White: Gypsy or Irish Traveller	–	–	166		203	
White: Roma	–	–	–	–	187	
White: Other	1,639		4,424		8,589	
Asian or Asian British: Total	5,128	3.2%	6,991		10,067	5.4%
Asian or Asian British: Indian	2,623		3,076		4,559	
Asian or Asian British: Pakistani	1,598	1%	2,243		3,368	
Asian or Asian British: Bangladeshi	98		162		207	
Asian or Asian British: Chinese	542		647		818	
Asian or Asian British: Other Asian	267		863		1,115	
Black or Black British: Total	928	0.6%	1,779		5,351	2.9%
Black or Black British: African	263		1,023		3,962	
Black or Black British: Caribbean	567		607		748	
Black or Black British: Other Black	98		149		641	
Mixed: Total	1,728	1.1%	2,983		4,844	
Mixed: White and Black Caribbean	935		1,423		2,083	
Mixed: White and Black African	108		278		676	
Mixed: White and Asian	452	0.3%	799		1,315	
Mixed: Other Mixed	233		483		770	
Other: Total	527		473		1,643	
Other: Arab	–	–	86	–	242	
Other: Any other ethnic group	527		387		1,401	
Non-White: Total	8,311	5.2%	12,226	7.3%	21,905	11.8%
Total	158,325	100%	166,641	100%	185,543	100%

== Economy ==
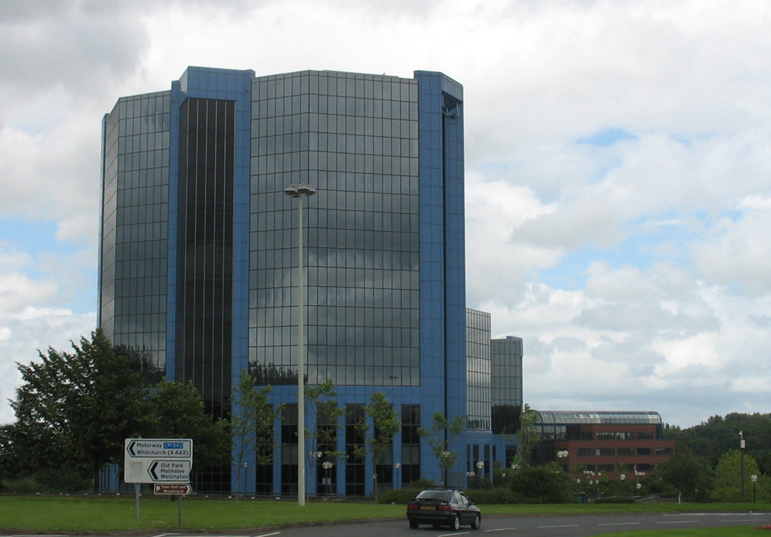
Telford Plaza in Telford Town Centre.

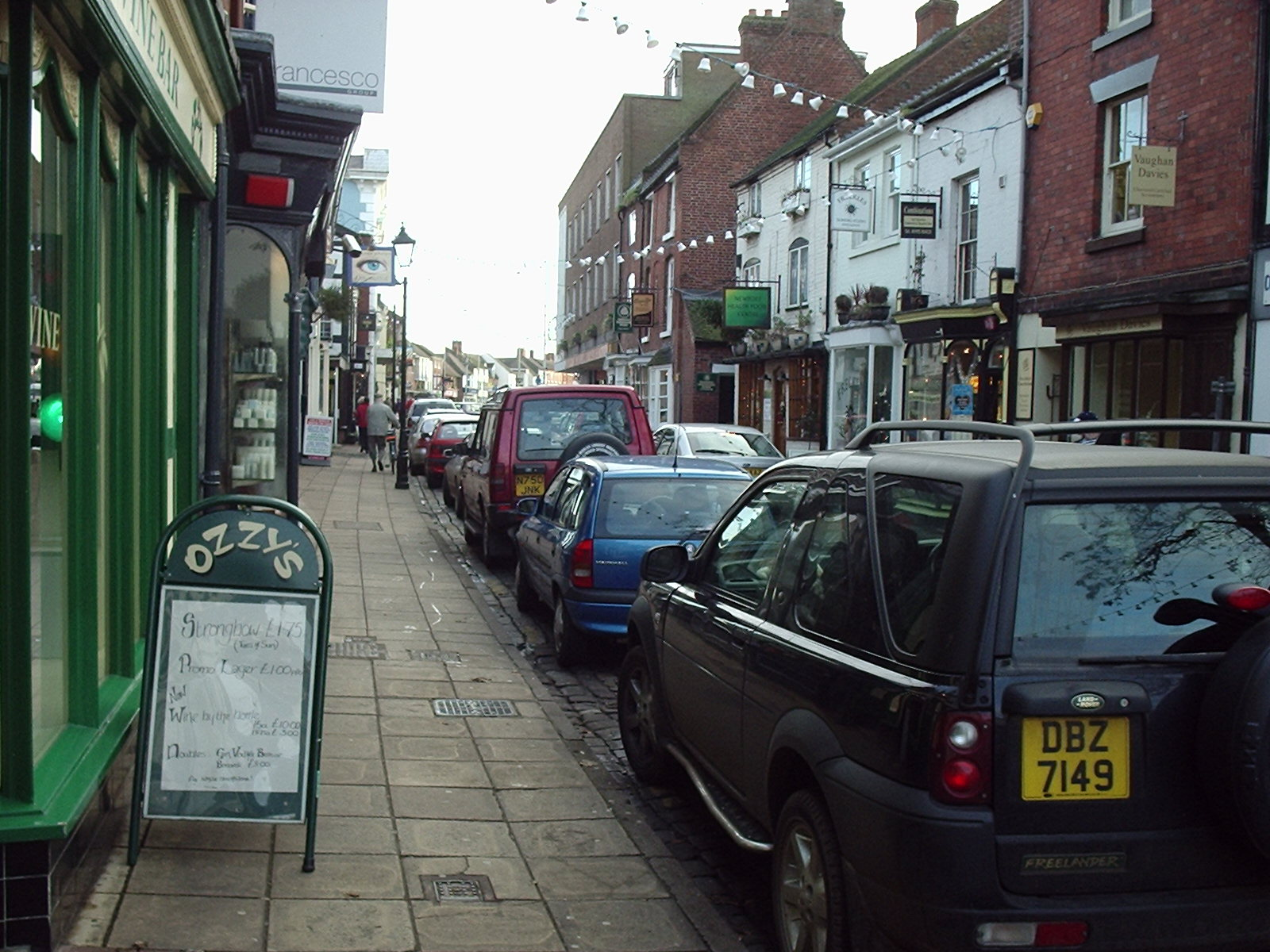
St Mary's Street in Newport

This is a chart of trend of regional gross value added of Telford and Wrekin at current basic prices published (pp. 240–253) by Office for National Statistics with figures in millions of British pounds sterling.

Year	Regional gross value added (Note: Components may not sum to totals due to rounding)	Agriculture (Note: includes hunting and forestry)	Industry (Note: includes energy and construction)	Services (Note: includes financial intermediation services indirectly measured)
1995	1,763	28	865	870
2000	2,072	20	773	1,279
2003	2,370	21	850	1,500

== Freedom of the Borough ==
The following people, military units and organisations have received the Freedom of the Borough of Telford and Wrekin.

=== People ===
- Iris Butler: 2002
- Richie Woodhall: 2002
- Lee Carter: 2005
- Elizabeth Holt: 2008
- Peter Gibbons: 2009
- George Whyle: 2011
- Corporal Ricky Fergusson: 2012
- Mickey Bushell: 2014
- Alan Olver: 2015
- John Alfred David Gill: 2017
- Liam Davies: 2023

=== Military units ===
- The Rifles: 29 May 2010
- D Squadron (The Shropshire Yeomanry): 15 May 2025.

=== Organisations ===
- Telford Crisis Support: 11 June 2022
- The Wrekin Housing Group

== See also ==
- Telford and Wrekin local elections
- The Wrekin – prominent hill to the west of Telford
- 1990s UK local government reform
- Shropshire Council – the other unitary authority in Shropshire
- Healthcare in Shropshire
