= St George's, Shropshire =

Village in Shropshire, England

Coordinates: 52.692659°N 2.437563°W

St George's
- Village
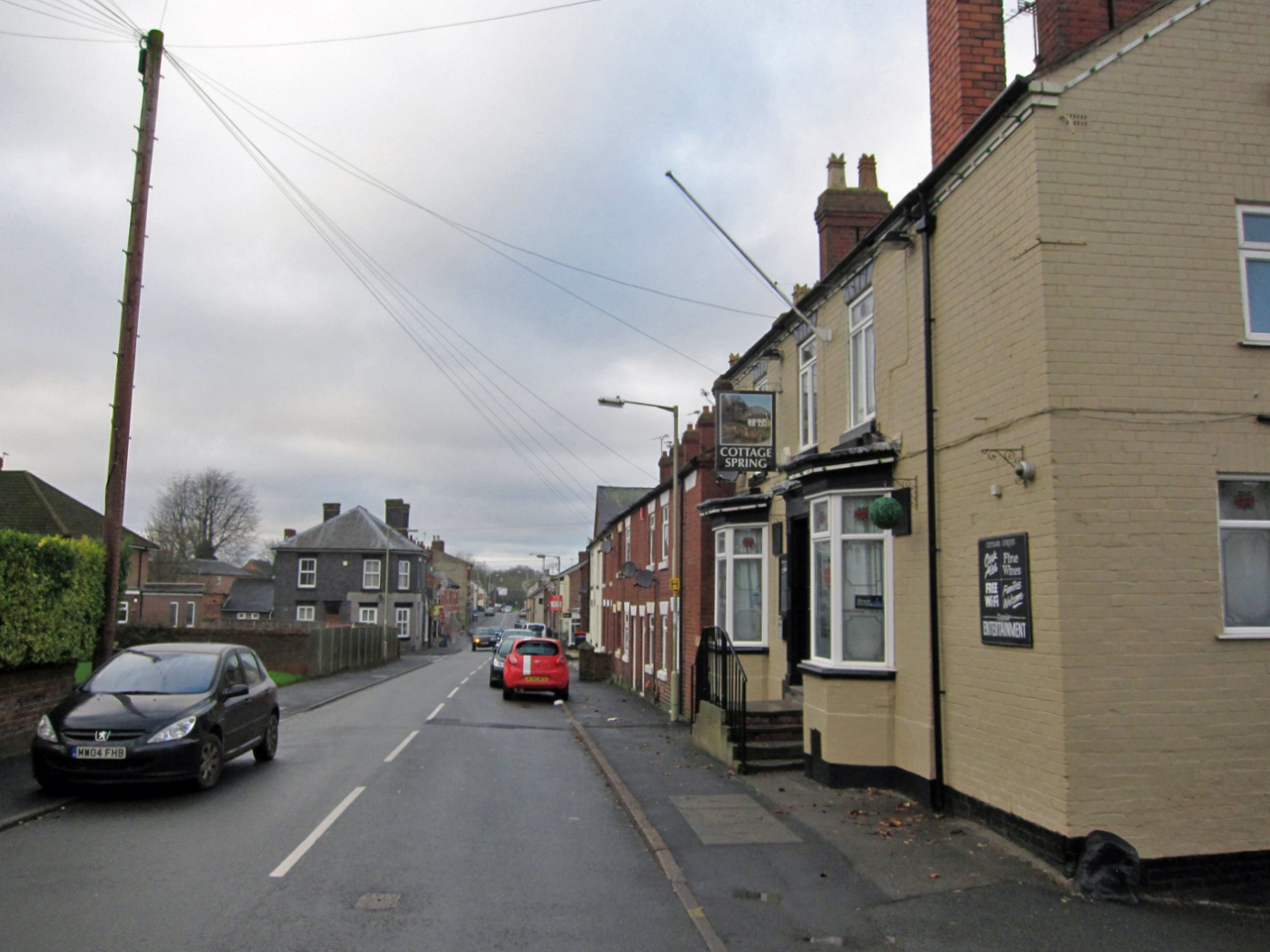
- Church Street, St George's

- Location within Shropshire
- OS grid reference: SJ705106
- Civil parish: St George's and Priorslee
- Unitary authority: Telford and Wrekin
- Ceremonial county: Shropshire
- Region: West Midlands
- Country: England
- Sovereign state: United Kingdom
- Post town: TELFORD
- Postcode district: TF2
- Dialling code: 01952
- Police: West Mercia
- Fire: Shropshire
- Ambulance: West Midlands
- UK Parliament: Telford

St George's is a large village in the Telford and Wrekin borough in Shropshire, England. It forms part of the St George's and Priorslee civil parish alongside Central Park, Priorslee, Redhill, Snedshill and St George's West.

== History ==
The village occupies an area that was home to a Roman settlement at nearby Red Hill. Roman coins were found in the surrounding area. St Georges was locally known as Pains Lane until the 1860s. At one point, it was recorded as King'es Wood in 1577 which was located adjacent to the modern-day village.

== St George's Church ==
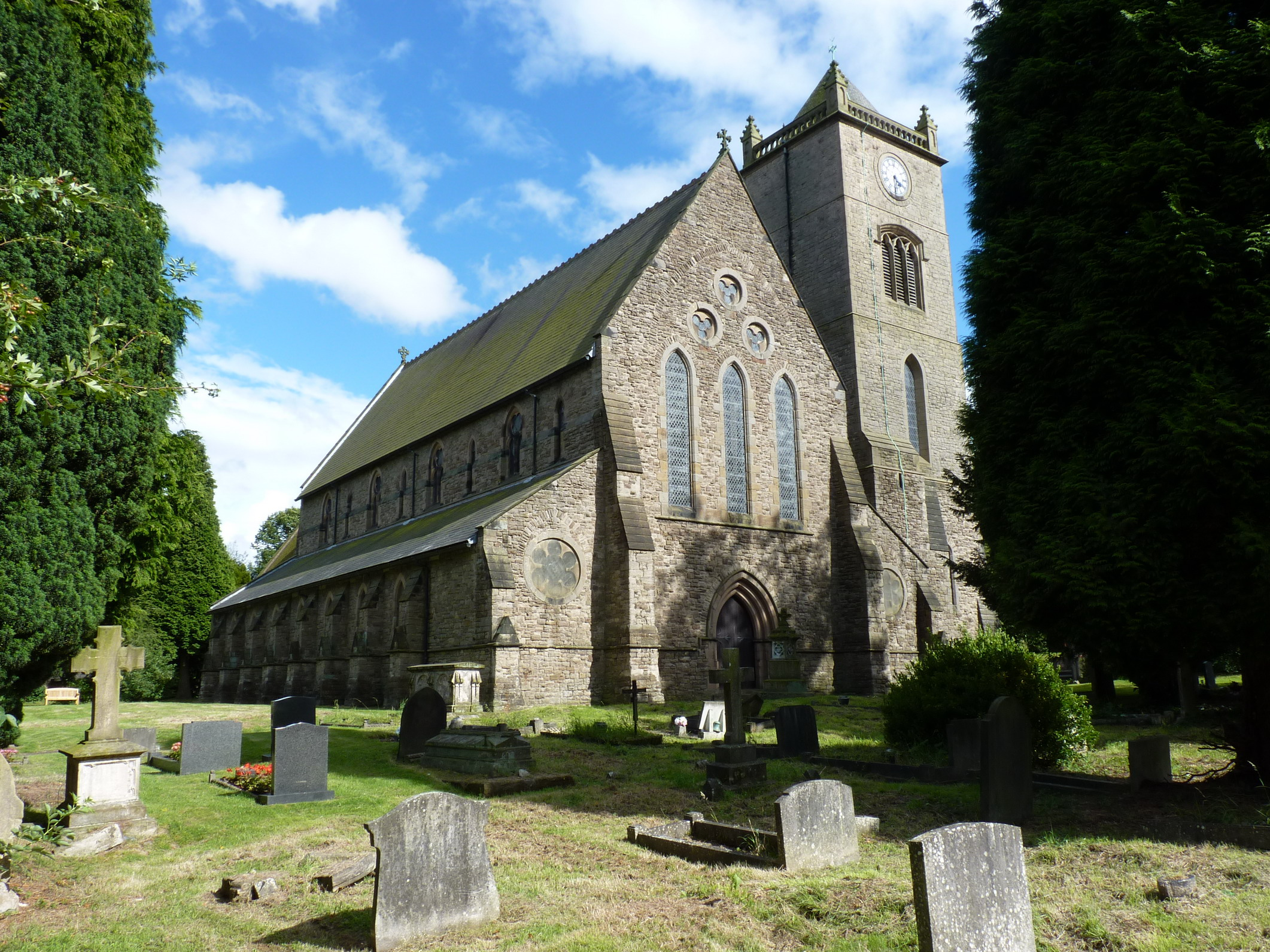
St George's Church, St George's

In 1861, a church was built in tribute to George Granville 2nd Duke of Sutherland. It remains an active place of worship and is a Grade II listed building.

== Industrial revolution ==
By the beginning of the Industrial Revolution, St George's grew rapidly following the arrival of both the Lilleshall Company in nearby Oakengates and the opening of the Wolverhampton - Shrewsbury Railway. It alongside neighbouring Priorslee grew rapidly for workers of the company and railway.

== Present day ==
St George's is a predominantly residential village with some local shopping amenities and is also close Stafford Park which is a mix of industrial and retail.

== Transport ==
The village is close to the Wolverhampton - Shrewsbury line with the nearest railway stations being Oakengates and nearby Shifnal. Historically, the village was served by the nearby Stafford - Shrewsbury Line with a station in nearby Trench and Donnington. The village is also close to the route of the original Watling Street which runs until the Lime Kiln Bank Roundabout. It then mostly disappears under the many areas of Telford until it resumes past nearby Wellington. There are also regular buses connecting the village to Telford, Shifnal, Newport, Wellington and Stafford.
