= Snedshill =

Village in Shropshire, England

Coordinates: 52.686737°N 2.436136°W

- Village
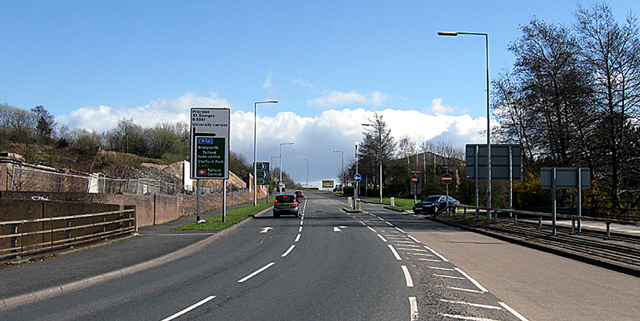
- Holyhead Road, Snedshill

- Location within Shropshire
- OS grid reference: SJ704099
- Civil parish: St George's and Priorslee
- Unitary authority: Telford and Wrekin
- Ceremonial county: Shropshire
- Region: West Midlands
- Country: England
- Sovereign state: United Kingdom
- Post town: TELFORD
- Postcode district: TF2
- Dialling code: 01952
- Police: West Mercia
- Fire: Shropshire
- Ambulance: West Midlands
- UK Parliament: Telford

Snedshill is a village in the Telford and Wrekin borough in Shropshire, England. It forms part of the St George's and Priorslee civil parish alongside Central Park, Priorslee, Redhill and St George's.

== History ==
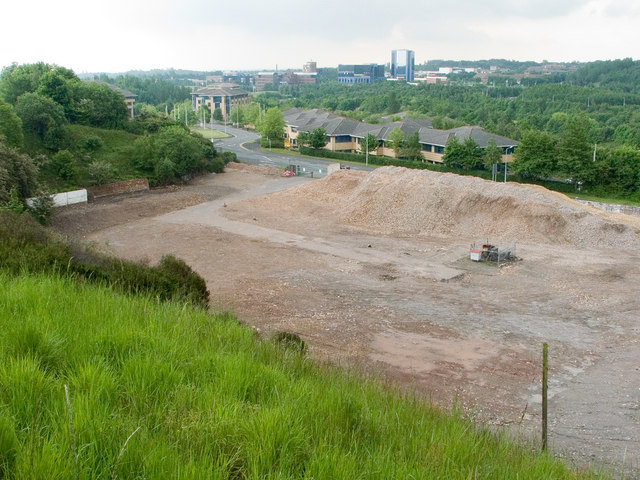
The site of the former Snedshill Brick Works and skyline of Telford.

The village was originally nothing more than a woodland. The arrival of the Lilleshall Company and its mineral railway saw the area around Snedshill and Mumpton Hill was developed with houses, industries and roads. There was also a brickworks owned by the Lilleshall Company that operated in the village until its closure in 1966.

== Transport ==
The village is close to the Wolverhampton - Shrewsbury line with the nearest railway stations being Oakengates and nearby Telford Central. The village is also close to the route of the original Watling Street which runs until the Lime Kiln Bank Roundabout. It then mostly disappears under the many areas of Telford until it resumes past nearby Wellington. There are also regular buses connecting the village to Telford and Wellington.
