= Dud Dudley =

English metallurgist (1600–1684)

Dudd (Dud) Dudley (c.1600–1684) was an English metallurgist, who fought on the Royalist side in the English Civil War as a soldier, military engineer, and supplier of munitions. He was one of the first Englishmen to smelt iron ore using coke.

== Background and early life ==
Dudley was the illegitimate son of Edward Sutton, 5th Baron Dudley of Dudley Castle. Dudd was the fourth of Lord Dudley's eleven children by his concubine Elizabeth, the daughter of William Tomlinson (she died 3 July 1629). Strictly, he was called Dudd Dudley otherwise Tomlinson. His eldest brother was Robert Dudley of Netherton Hall. Dudd married Eleanor Heaton, (1606–1675), on 12 October 1626, at St. Helen's Church, Worcester.

Lord Dudley (though he had a legitimate son, and a granddaughter by him, as well as four legitimate daughters and numerous grandchildren) seemed to have attended to the up-bringing of his natural children by Elizabeth Tomlinson; he educated and provided for them. On the other hand, he failed to support his wife and legitimate children, even after he was imprisoned and ordered to do so by the Privy Council in 1597. Dudd was raised at Himley Hall. As a youth, he began his study on the various processes of iron manufacturing at his father's iron works near Dudley. His speculations in the improvement of iron production were encouraged by his father, who gave him an education intended to enhance his practical abilities.

== Ironmaster ==
In 1622, at the age of about 20, Dud left Balliol College, Oxford, to take charge of his father's furnace and forges on Pensnett Chase. Later he referred to "wood and charcoal growing then scant and pit-coles [coal] ... abounding", and so began to use the latter. He turned the coal into coke, a hard, foam-like mass of almost pure carbon made from bituminous coal, and later claimed to have perfected the use of coal instead of charcoal for iron production.

Dudley probably modified his furnace to accommodate the new process, but the quantity of iron initially produced was reduced to about three tons a week from a furnace. Dudd wrote to his father, then in London, informing him of his success, desiring him to immediately seek a patent from King James. Dudley's patent, dated 22 February 1622, was taken out by (and in the name of) his father Edward, Lord Dudley. (Note: The text of the patent may be found in a standard legal source book of 1844, Webster's Reports on Patents, p. 14. It provides both the standard legal date, 19 Jac. 1, and its equivalent historical date of 1622. Webster's is available as free download from Google Books.)

Dudley proceeded with the manufacture of iron at Pensnett, and Cradley in Staffordshire, and a year after the patent was granted he was able to send a considerable quantity of the new iron for trial to the Tower of London. Under the King's command, many experiments were made with it: its qualities were fairly tested, and it was pronounced "good merchantable iron".

The Black Country, including Dudley, was already a major centre of iron manufacture in England ("Within ten miles of Dudley Castle there were 20,000 smiths of all sorts and many iron works at that time within that circle decayed for want of wood"). With such an obvious abundance of coal, some places being found in seams up to ten feet thick, and ironstone four feet in depth immediately under the coal, and with limestone adjacent to both, the ability to make iron with coal (coke) held out the prospect of great profits, but Dudd Dudley failed to obtain them. As water power was the main means of driving bellows for furnaces, as well as drop hammers, rolling and sharpening mills, iron production and working in Staffordshire and Worcestershire was concentrated along the small rivers: the Worcestershire Stour, its main tributary, the River Smestow, and many smaller streams in their catchment.

=== The great Mayday flood ===
The new works had been in successful operation little more than a year, when a flood swept away Dudley's principal works at Cradley, and otherwise caused considerable damage downstream.

"At the market town called Stourbridge," according to Dudd, "although the author sent with speed to preserve the people from drowning, and one resolute man was carried from the bridge there in the day time, the nether part of the town was so deep in water that the people had much ado to preserve their lives in the uppermost rooms of their houses".

Dudd, undaunted and with a passion, set to work repairing his furnaces and forges at some great cost; and in a short time was again back in full production. However, the "charcoal ironmasters ... did him much prejudice, not only by detaining his stock, but disparaging the iron".

In order to ascertain the quality of the product by testing it on a large scale, the King commanded Dudd to send to the Tower of London quantities of all the various sorts of bar iron made by him, fit for the "making of muskets, carbines, and iron for great bolts for shipping; which iron", records Dudd, "being so tried by artists and smiths, the iron masters and iron-mongers were all silenced until the 21st year of King James's reign".

=== Later furnaces ===
However, this favourable report on his iron did not prevent him being "outed of his works and inventions ... by the Iron-masters and others wrongfully". This certainly applies to his second furnace, at Himley, which his father let this to Richard Foley in 1625, and may well apply to Cradley, which was later in Foley's hands.

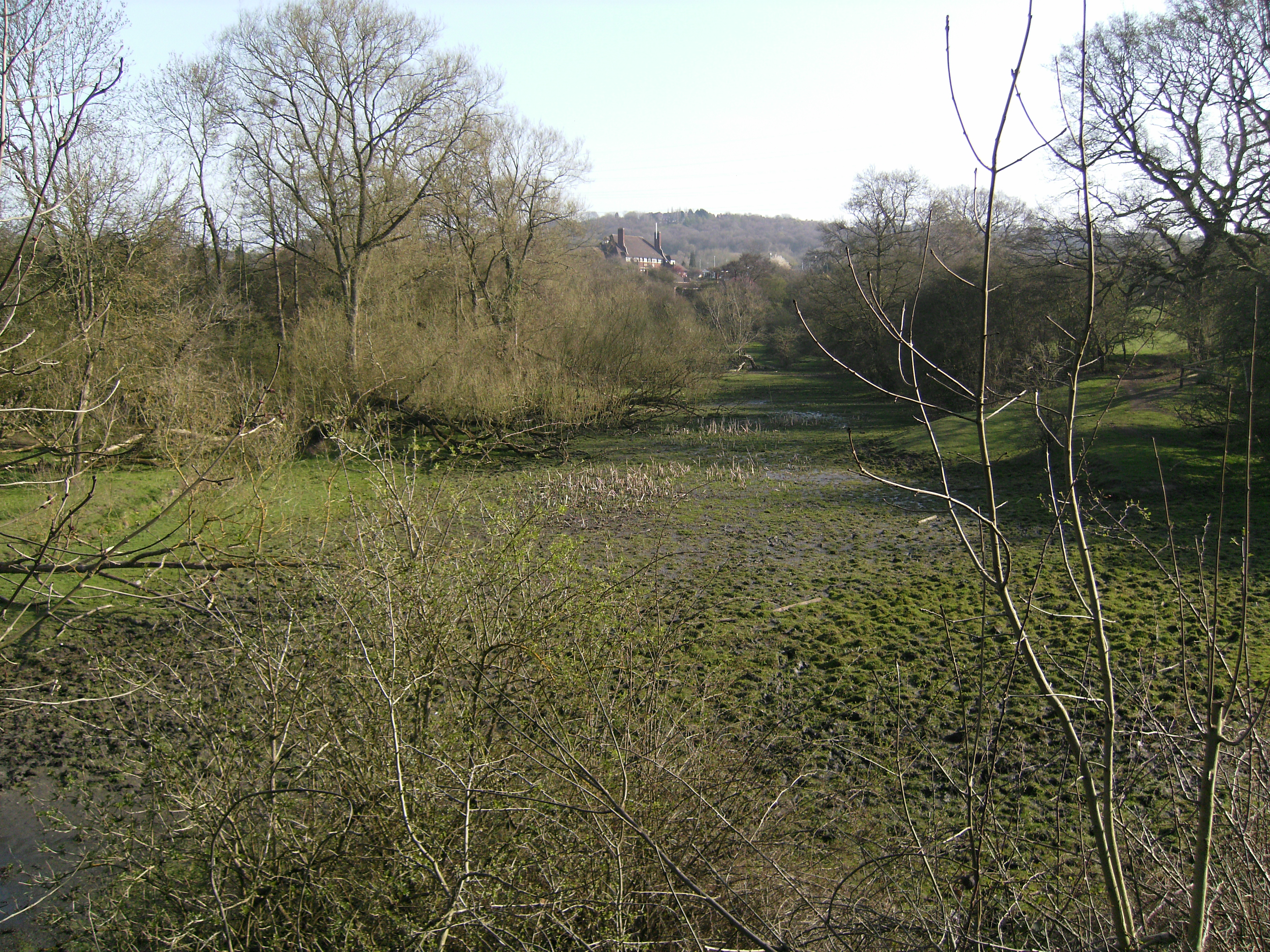
The Staits Brook at Askew Bridge. Extant banks around this marshy area suggest it was formerly a small reservoir. Below this, the brook runs with considerable force even in dry weather, making this a good spot for water-driven machinery.

Afterwards he built a new furnace, Hasco or Hascod Furnace, near what is now Askew Bridge at Gornal.

The Authour Erected a new large Furnace on purpose, 27-foot square, all of stone for his new Invention, at a place called, Hasco Bridge, in the parish of Sedgley, and County of Stafford; the Bellows of which Furnace were larger than ordinary Bellows are, in which work he made 7 Tuns of Iron per week, the greatest quantity of Pit-cole-Iron that ever yet was made in Great Brittain; near which Furnace, the Author discovered many new Cole-mines 10 yards thick, and Iron-mine under it, according to other Cole-works; which Cole-works being brought unto perfection, the Author was by force thrown out of them, and the Bellows of his new Furnace and Invention, by riotous persons cut in pieces, to his no small prejudice, and loss of his Invention of making of Iron with Pit-cole, Sea-cole, &c.

Dudley was economical with the truth. Hasco furnace was built in 1626, but in November 1627 he let it to Roger Hill, who assigned it to Foley. After Foley had used it for nine months he heard that Lord Dudley was claiming it and "durst not bring any stock" there, but continued to pay the rent. Dudd and Foley had an oral agreement for the supply of ironstone, but Lord Dudley discharged the workmen from the mines, and stopped Foley's horses carrying the ironstone until Foley paid for it (again) to Lord Dudley. Ultimately, his father "entered" the furnace in 1631, and cut the dam. The bellows were probably cut without Lord Dudley's approval, but his re-entry to forfeit the lease was lawful and thus not a riot.

== After ironmaking ==
Dudley "claimed" the manor of Himley, because his father had at one point put this in his name, probably to avoid it being seized by his creditors. This led to Chancery proceedings, which he lost, spending a time in prison for contempt of court.

He obtained a new patent in 1638 for smelting metals with pitcoal, but was probably unable to exploit it. Of this period, he wrote:

So that being with Law-Suites, and Riots, wearied and disabled to prosecute his Art and Invention at present, even untill the first Patent was extinct: Notwithstanding the Author his sad Sufferings, Imprisonments wrongfully for several thousand pound in the Counter in London, yet did obtaine a new Pattent, dated the 2d of May, Anno 14. Caroli Primi of ever Blessed Memory, not only for the making of Iron into cast-works, and bars, but also for the Melting, Extracting, Refining and Reducing of all Mines, Minerals and Mettals, with Pit-cole, Sea-cole, Peat, and Turf, for the Preservation of Wood and Timber of this Island; into which Pattent, the Author, for the better support and management of his Invention, so much opposed formerly at the Court, at the Parliament, and at the Law, took in David Ramsey, Esquire, Resident at the Court; Sir George Horsey, at the Parliament; Roger Foulke, Esquire, a Counsellour of the Temple, and an Ingenious Man; and also an Iron Master, my Neighbour, and one who did well know my former Sufferings, and what I had done in the Invention of making of Iron with Pit-cole, &c.

== Civil War ==
He served as an army officer in the Bishops War and on the Royalist side throughout the English Civil War. He served as a colonel in the Royalist Army and was general of the ordnance to Prince Maurice, and then Lord Astley. He may have supervised the modernisation of the Worcester City defences in time for the aborted siege of 1643, and was taken prisoner at the end of the Siege of Worcester in 1646. In 1648, he and others were captured by Andrew Yarranton (a Parliamentary captain) in "Bosco Bello" (Boscobel) woods, while they were planning a Royalist rising to seize Dawley Castle. He was sent to London and tried for treason. He and his fellow conspirators were condemned to death, but escaped during "sermon time" from the Gatehouse, the prison at Westminster where they were held. (Note: Smiles 1864, p. 79: His Civil War service is described in A. Bedford-Smith, Dudonius Dudley (typescript in Birmingham Central Library, class L78.1).)

He escaped to Bristol and lived in hiding as "Dr Hunt", a medical doctor. In 1651, shortly before the 1638 patent was due to expire, he set up lead smelting works in partnership with connections of a medical patient, using an "old belhouse for the bloomery" at Clifton, Bristol. This was probably a reverberatory furnace and the first known use of such for this purpose. This did not work out, but it is possible that he was associated with a later venture at Stockley Slade (now Nightingale Valley) on the other side of the Avon.

== Metallum Martis ==
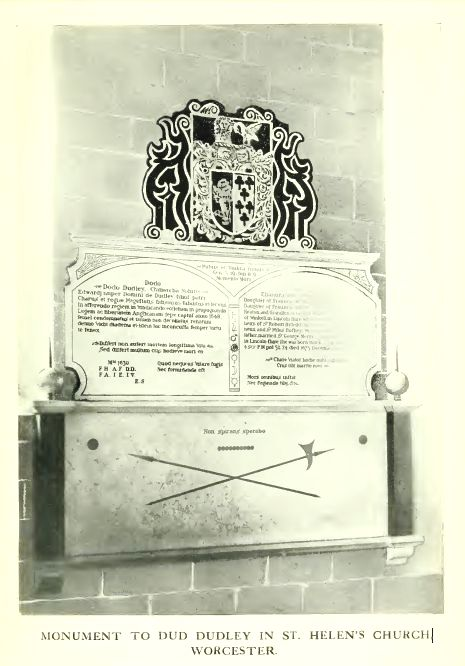
Memorial to Dud Dudley in St Helen's, Worcester

After the Restoration, Dudd's lands reverted to him, having been sold by "usurping powers" in about 1652.

His book Metallum Martis (1665—quoted above) is Dudd Dudley's personal view of his discovery, after he had unsuccessfully petitioned King Charles II, to restore his public offices and patents.

Metallum Martis may be regarded as a prospectus, seeking investors to exploit his invention of coke smelting. This appears to have been successful as a furnace was built at Dudley (whose existence is recalled by the street name "Furnace Road". In subsequent litigation, Sir Clement Clerke (one of the partners) stated,

Dud Dudley did heretofore build a furnace for making iron or melting ironstone to be blown or set on work by the strength of men and horses without the help of water.

This melted down "ironstone with charcoal made of wood and pitcoal". Such a horsemill-powered blast furnace is almost certainly unique, and only operated for a few years.

== Old age and working as a doctor ==
Dudley's last years are obscure. He probably lived in Friar Street, Worcester, where he had a house derived from his first wife's family. He may have practised as a doctor there. He married again and had a son in his old age. He died in 1684, at age 85. He was buried in the parish church St. Helen's, Worcester (25 October 1684), where he had erected a monument to his first wife, bearing the following Latin inscription (see illustration):

Dodo Dudley chiliarchi nobilis Edwardi nuper domini de Dudley filius, patri charus et regiae Majestatis fidissimus subditus et servus in asserendo regem, in vindicando ecclesiam, in propugnando legem ac libertatem Anglicanam, saepe captus, anno 1648, semel condemnatus et tamen non-decollatus, renatum denuo vidit diadaema hic inconcussa semper virtute senex.	Colonel Dud Dudley, (Note: "chiliarch" is some kind of military title, literally "commander of a thousand men") son of the late noble Edward of Dudley, dear to his father and most faithful subject and servant to His Majesty the King, in vindicating the church, in fighting for English law and liberty; often captured, in the year 1648 once condemned nevertheless not beheaded; born again, as an old man he sees an unshakeable crown.

The date of Dudley's death does not appear on the monument.

== Posterity ==
The existence of Metallum Martis meant that many historians have noted his achievements. Dud has been seen as the forerunner of later success by Abraham Darby and others in smelting iron with coke in the 18th century. However it remains unclear to what extent he was its technological ancestor rather than a mere precursor. For example, in the 1950s it was shown by chemical analysis that the coal that Dud Dudley used was not suitable as a raw material for coke while the coal used by Abraham Darby was suitable, leading Richard Kirby to state in 1990 that "The consensus among experts is that Dudley was a wishful thinker ... and that he never did what he set out in his youth to do".

In Metallum Martis, Dudley named a relative of his first wife to whom he would leave his knowledge, but nothing came of that. However, there are two possible linkages to later developments:

- Abraham Darby, who took over the ironworks at Coalbrookdale in 1709, was descended from Dudd's older full sister (also the daughter of Elizabeth Tomlinson).
- Sir Clement Clerke, a partner in the Dudley furnace, developed lead smelting in reverberatory furnaces. He and his son Talbot Clerke then applied this method to copper smelting and to iron foundry work. Associates in the latter business, floated as the Company for Making Iron with Pitcoal, built a coke furnace at Cleator in Cumberland in the 1690s. That company had some dispute with Shadrach Fox of Coalbrookdale, who was casting shot for the Board of Ordnance, and it may have used coal at another furnace at Wombridge.
