= Beveley =

Hamlet in Shropshire, England

Coordinates: 52.697130°N 2.470693°W

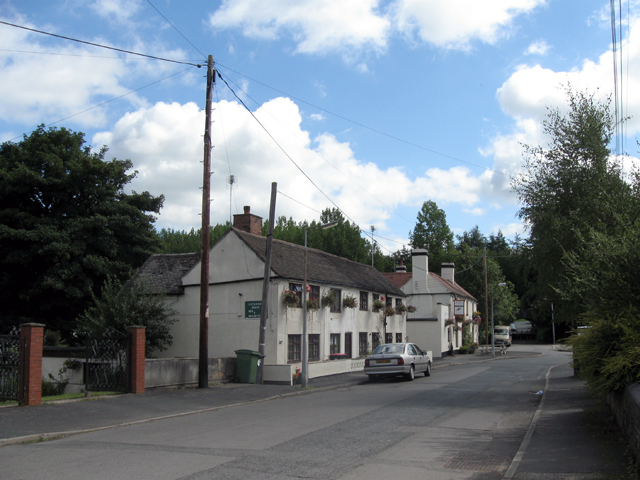
- The former Watling Street road passing through Beveley

- Location within Shropshire
- OS grid reference: SJ683110
- Unitary authority: Telford and Wrekin
- Ceremonial county: Shropshire
- Region: West Midlands
- Country: England
- Sovereign state: United Kingdom
- Post town: TELFORD
- Postcode district: TF1
- Dialling code: 01952
- Police: West Mercia
- Fire: Shropshire
- Ambulance: West Midlands
- UK Parliament: Telford

Beveley is a former hamlet straddling the boundaries of Ketley and Oakengates in the Telford and Wrekin borough in Shropshire, England. It is located to the northeast of Ketley and close to Hadley Manor and Red Lake. Nearby places include the towns of Oakengates, Telford and Wellington. and the villages and areas of Hadley and Wombridge. The area is predominantly residential and close to the Wolverhampton–Shrewsbury line and woodlands. Part of the former Roman road Watling Street passes through the centre of Beveley, although this is now mostly bypassed by the nearby M54 motorway between Wellington and Shrewsbury.

The Victoria County History of Shropshire reports a settlement called Stanebrook along Watling Street in 1447, "on the site of the modern Beveley", and that "There were probably miners' cottages along the road by the late 17th century". The dwellings were on land owned by the Leveson Gowers and had the appearance of a squatter settlement. Beveley was described in Cassie's 1871 History, Gazetteer and Directory of Shropshire as "a small hamlet adjoining Ketley, partly in Wellington parish and partly in Wombridge". The hamlet of Beveley was still listed in the 1943 edition of John Bartholomew's Survey Gazetteer of the British Isles.

Beveley ward elects one member to Ketley parish council. The ward is bounded by the railway to the north, and the B4373 to the east, and partly by the B5061 road to the south. It elects three of the eleven members of the parish council.
