= St George's and Priorslee =

Coordinates: 52°41.5′N 2°26′W

- Civil parish
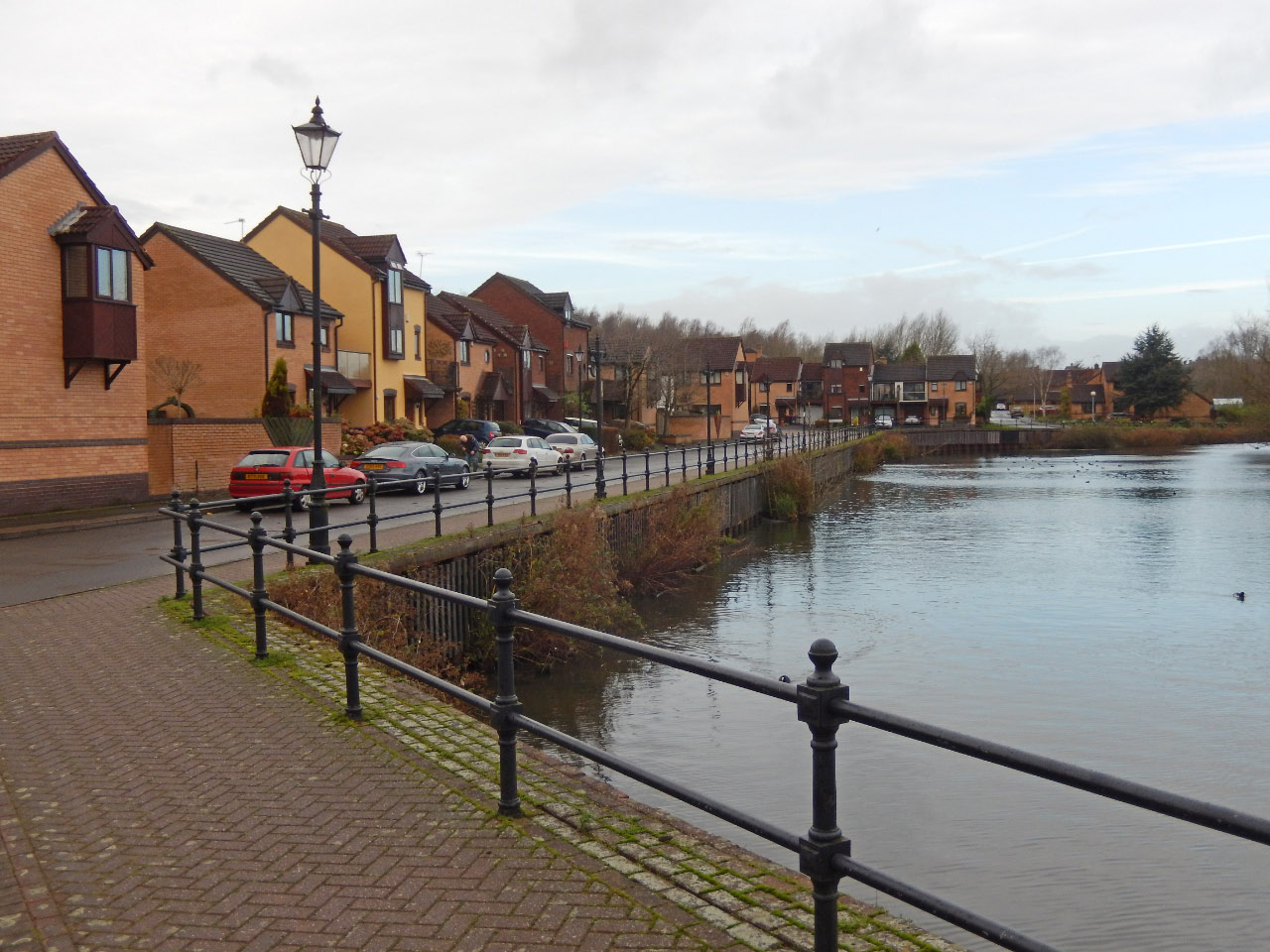
- Derwent Drive, Priorslee

- Location within Shropshire
- Area: 5.30 km^{2} (2.05 sq mi)
- Population: 11,033 (2011 census)
  - Density: 2,082/km^{2} (5,390/sq mi)
- Civil parish: St George's and Priorslee
- Unitary authority: Telford and Wrekin
- Ceremonial county: Shropshire
- Region: West Midlands
- Country: England
- Sovereign state: United Kingdom
- Post town: TELFORD
- Postcode district: TF2
- Dialling code: 01952
- Police: West Mercia
- Fire: Shropshire
- Ambulance: West Midlands
- Website: www.stgeorgesandpriorslee-pc.gov.uk

St George's and Priorslee is a civil parish in the borough of Telford and Wrekin, Shropshire, England. The parish had a population of 11,033 at the 2011 census, and has an area of 2.05 sq mi (5.30 km^{2}).

== Geography ==
The parish lies northeast of the Telford and east of the town of Oakengates. The A5 runs through the area, and junction 4 of the M54 motorway is just to the south. The Priorslee area is also the site of major housing developments concentrating some of the more expensive housing in the town of Telford

== Education ==
The Priorslee area of Telford contains the Priorslee Campus of the University of Wolverhampton. At the centre of the Priorslee Campus is the grade II listed eighteenth century Priorslee Hall. There is also a primary school and a secondary school (Holy Trinity Academy).

== Parish council ==
The parish council covers the settlements within the area and is the lowest tier of local government.

== List of settlements ==
The parish covers the following settlements:

- Central Park
- Priorslee
- Redhill
- Snedshill
- St George's

== See also ==
- Listed buildings in St George's and Priorslee
