= Wombridge Priory =

Augustinian monastery in Shropshire, England

Coordinates: 52.7014682°N 2.4585396°W

Wombridge Priory was a small Augustinian monastery in Wombridge, in Shropshire, England. Established in the early 12th century, it was supported by a network of minor nobility and was never a large community. Despite generally good financial management, it fell within the scope of the Suppression of Religious Houses Act 1535 and was dissolved in the following year.

== Foundation ==
William Dugdale, the pioneering historian of Britain's monasteries, thought that Wombridge Priory was founded by William FitzAlan, who dominated Shropshire and large tracts of the Welsh Marches in the early to mid 12th century. It is now known that it was founded by or for William of Hadley, a much less powerful landowner, and a vassal of William FitzAlan, who was tenant-in-chief of the manor of Hadley. William of Hadley was the terre tenant or lord of the manor. William was married to Seburga, an illegitimate daughter of a much wealthier and more powerful baron, Hamo Peveril, whose seat was High Ercall Hall. The earliest grant of lands to the Priory, consisting of the site in Hadley Wood and a half virgate at High Hatton, must date from 1136 or a little earlier and was made by William of Hadley, Seburga and their son, Alan of Hadley. The only record of it is in a document confirming William FitzAlan's approval of his tenants' actions. FitzAlan's confirmation quite explicitly recognises that the gift comes from William, Seburga and Alan but says it is pro salute animae suae – for the salvation of his soul, in the singular: perhaps simply a mistake. However it seems that William died around 1136, perhaps between the gift and its confirmation. The document refers to Canonicis de Wombrug, implying that the community envisaged in the grant was composed of Augustinian Canons Regular.

FitzAlan's confirmation seems to be the origin of the idea that he was the founder, although he appears only as William of Hadley's feudal lord. A much later document of 1319 mentions FitzAlan's confirmation while omitting the original founders. FitzAlan had his own monastic foundation to tend, Haughmond Abbey, and was a great benefactor to Shrewsbury Abbey, as were his dynasty for centuries.

== Location ==
The foundation document describes Wombridge Priory's location as

| Latin | English |
|---|---|
| locum illum in silva de Hedlega qui ex uno latere rivulo uno terminatur qui silvam de Hedlega et silvam Regis discriminat secundo vero latere, alio rivulo finitur qui dicitur Sprungewallabroc, tercioque latere sui terminum facit Watlingestret. | "That place in Hadley Wood, defined on one side by a stream that divides Hadley Wood and the king's wood, on the second side by a stream called Springwell Brook, and with the third side reaching its limit at Watling Street." |

The Priory was built in a clearing in Hadley Wood, less than one kilometre north of Watling Street. The royal wood from which it was separated by a stream was properly called Mount Gilbert Forest, more commonly known as the Wrekin, and this neighbouring part of it subsequently became known as Wrockwardine Wood. The village of Wombridge grew up adjacent the priory, on its demesne lands, with Oakengates as a small hamlet nearby. During the Industrial Revolution, Oakengates grew rapidly, dwarfing and absorbing Wombridge itself. In the 1960s it became a constituent part of the new town of Telford, which is now part of the borough of Telford and Wrekin, a unitary authority, and so not under Shropshire Council. The priory site is now occupied by the Church of St Mary and St Leonard.

== Dedication ==
The priory was dedicated to St Leonard. The seal in use in the early 13th century bore the inscription SIGILLUM SANCTI LEONARDI DE WOMBRUG and showed the saint holding a pastoral staff, the symbol of a bishop, and a book. St Leonard was particularly popular in the 12th century following the release of Bohemond I of Antioch, a captured crusader – a circumstance which he seems to have attributed to the saint's intercession. White Ladies Priory, another Shropshire Augustinian house, was also dedicated to St Leonard, as was the parish church at Bridgnorth.

== Endowments ==
The priory built up a small but fairly compact portfolio of property, mainly in the first century of its existence. The benefactors were mostly middle-ranking, ranging from FitzAlan vassals making formal grants to newly wealthy landowners showing gratitude and generosity.

Seburga and her sons continued to endow the priory, usually from property they had inherited from Hamo de Peveril. Alan donated land at Cherrington and a ninth of all his tithable property, as well confirming the grant at High Hatton, although the Cherrington land may also have been a joint gift from Alan and his father. His brother, William of Ercall (sometimes called William of Hadley), also gave a ninth of his tithable property, land at High Ercall that became the monastic grange of Shirlowe, and pasturage rights over the whole manor. Alan died about 1194, leaving his daughter Cecilia as sole heiress. She married Sir Roger Corbet and the estates remained with various branches of the Corbet family for nearly five centuries, breaking the close link with the founders.

However, endowments still continued to be made from the former Peveril estates, even though they had been granted to new tenants by Henry II – often to people who had aided him in his Welsh campaigns. Their gratitude seems to have been directed towards the priory. This was the case at Sutton Maddock, acquired by Gervase Goch as a reward for acting as an intermediary for the king. There was apparently some ambiguity about the church, which Madoc, son of Gervase, cleared up by granting the advowson to Wombridge Priory in 1186-7 – a grant confirmed by the king himself. Roger Mussun, who made his fortune as a horse trader on behalf of the king, was granted the manor of Uppington after it escheated to the king, on a serjeanty tenure, for annual service of one sparrowhawk, and acquired Harrington in Sutton Maddock on similar terms. He was sufficiently grateful to include the king's soul with those of himself and his wife when he gave Wombridge Priory the advowson and tithes of the chapel at Uppington. Perhaps around the same time, in 1189, he also gave the priory a large area of waste and woodland at Wichley, part of Uppington. This gave the canons a secure foothold from which they sought to expand to a substantial grange. Roger was dead within two years, apparently in disgrace with Richard I, but Galiena, his widow, continued his beneficence to the priory, giving half a virgate of land at Harrington. Griffin of Sutton, Madoc's son and heir, gave a substantial area of woodland and made numerous small grants to the priory, including rents paid in cocks and hens, receiving from the canons in recognition of his constant generosity two horses: a destrier and a palfrey.

Griffin's wife was Matilda LeStrange and her family also made small grants to the priory. John LeStrange II, lord of Wrockwardine, conceded rights to exploit parts of Wrockwardine Wood. However, the LeStranges did not show a sustained interest.

The Dunstanville family of Shifnal became substantial and consistent benefactors. Robert and Alan Dunstanville were brothers, thought by Eyton to be sons of Reginald de Dunstanville, 1st Earl of Cornwall, an illegitimate son of Henry I. who, like William FitzAlan, were close supporters of Empress Matilda during the Anarchy, in her struggle against Stephen of Blois. They were with her at Oxford and elsewhere during her near-successful bid for power in 1141. Both had or acquired interests in Sussex, close to the FitzAlan's other strongholds, and Alan, the younger brother, acquired the manor of Idsall or Shifnal in Shropshire. He then made a range of gifts to monasteries, including two to Wombridge: half a virgate, then farmed by a man called Eilric, followed by a further nine acres - all at Lee, a settlement that thus became known as Priorslee.

Alan predeceased his brother, but as Robert died sine prole, it was Alans's eldest son, Walter, who inherited the now-substantial family estates. He confirmed his father's grants and added fourteen more acres at Lee. Then came a grant of Aynulf's Lee, apparently a further substantial accession of land at Priorslee. Walter directed that, if he should die in England, his body should be taken to Wombridge for burial. Further, he gave the priory two mills on his estates, with the direction that the income from them should support a perpetual chantry at Wombridge for the souls of himself and Hawise, his wife. This came with a further gift of twenty acres of woodland. After Walter's death in the 1190s, his nephew Thomas Basset gave some land at Wich Malbank or Nantwich to the priory for the good of Walter's soul. In the 1260s, Walter III, grandson of the original Walter, gave Wombridge Priory a mill at Grindle, near Ryton, various small patches of land, river banks and woodland, and rights in his woods, including housebote and haybote and pannage. Grindle Mill originally belonged to Richard, the lord of Grindle, and was bought by Walter for the specific purpose of presenting it to Wombridge Priory. The canons thus became liable to pay a token annual rent of half a penny to Richard. However Richard himself also made a series of gifts to the priory: two half virgates of land, several areas of meadow and the right to pasture 200 sheep and the animals of any tenants they installed on the land. He also gave the canons permission to take their carts across his land to obtain stone from his quarries and released them from any requirement to attend his manorial court. His son and heir, John, quit-claimed even the half penny rent for the mill.

Another benefactor was Alexander of Loppington, who, around 1190, gave advowson of the church at Loppington, in north Shropshire, to Wombridge Priory. In the 1190s John de Cambrai gave a virgate and eight acres of land, as well as a meadow, at Wappenshall in his manor of Lee Cumbray (now Leegomery), north-west of Hadley. The witnesses included Robert of Shrewsbury, dean of St Mary's, Shrewsbury, who witnessed a number of charters for the priory, William of Hadley or Ercall, Roger Corbet, Richard of Idshall (Shifnal) and many others. There seems to have been a network of middle-ranking landowners, friends of the Hadleys and mostly vassals of the FitzAlans, who ensured that the priory was well, if not lavishly, funded in its early decades. Their benefactions were a form of social solidarity in this life, and in many cases afforded them a family chantry and mausoleum that would have been beyond their reach in the great abbeys.

== Charters ==
The existence of the priory, and most of its holdings, were recognised by a long series of charters and many other supportive documents collected in its cartulary in the 15th century. The earliest and most important of the royal charters was issued by Henry II at Feckenham in about 1181. This attests that the priory is dedicated to St Leonard and recognises some of the early grants the priory, including those of the Hadleys and the Dunstanvilles. In a slightly later charter the king gave the priory 80 acres of assarts in the neighbouring forest. The most comprehensive royal charter was issued by Edward II in 1319 to confirm an extremely detailed list of properties and benefactors compiled by the priory.

The first papal bull to recognise the priory is precisely dated to 23 June 1187 at Verona and was issued by Pope Urban III. It took the house into papal protection and confirmed that it was to follow the Augustinian Rule, electing its own prior. The canons were given the right to bury whom they wished at the priory and permitted to continue worship during times of interdict. A schedule was attached, listing the lands of the priory. As the estates expanded around 1190, Hugh Nonant, the Bishop of Coventry, issued three confirmatory charters. Around the same time, Baldwin of Forde, the Archbishop of Canterbury, confirmed the grant of the church at Sutton Maddock. Pope Innocent III issued three bulls recognising and protecting the priory, one in 1199 and two in 1205. The latter year seems to have been one of crisis, as the pope also issued bulls commanding the abbot of Shrewsbury to protect the priory against false claims for debt and the prior of Wenlock Priory to intervene on behalf of Wombridge against harassment by ecclesiastical officials claiming to act for the Pope.

The independence of the priory was challenged by Great Bricett Priory in Suffolk, in the 13th century according to Victoria County History, although Eyton thought earlier. Bricett had claims to being the original Augustinian house in England and on this basis demanded Haughmond Abbey surrender its daughter houses of Wombridge and Ranton Priory in Staffordshire. Bricett accepted 40s. from Haughmond to remit its claim to Ranton, which subsequently became independent. However, the claim to Wombridge seems to have gone no further, as Haughmond had never laid claim to it.

== Monastic life and leadership ==
Wombridge was always a small monastery and seldom had more than four canons and a prior in its last two centuries of existence. The priory buildings erected in the 12th century, perhaps at least partly wooden, were damaged by fire and in 1232 Henry III ordered that they canons have four oaks from the royal forest for “works on their burnt church.” Richard of Grindle's gift of access to building stone was probably from about this time. About 1269 Thomas Tuschet, then lord of Lee Cumbray, gave the priory similar access to quarries in his wood at Ketley, so building must have gone on for some time. Around 1328 the priory acquired a new Lady chapel, and visitors were granted a forty-day indulgence.

Despite the closeness of their patrons, the canons defended their right to elect their own prior freely. In 1248, Roger Corbet, successor to the Hadleys, took legal action against Prior Baldwin, alleging that he had allowed himself to be presented to the Bishop of Lichfield immediately after his election, instead of coming first to himself, the patron of the priory, as previous priors had done. The canons would have been concerned that Corbet might attempt to exercise primer seisin, i.e. the right to take the revenues during a vacancy and perhaps for the first year. However, the parties were able to agree that the patron should take only simple seisin, i.e. ceremonial exercise of lordship, sending his representative into the priory, but leaving the estates untouched and not interfering in or claiming to license the election. For their part, the canons were to present the prior elect to the patron, who was then to convey the information in person or by open letter to the bishop. If he failed to do so, the canons themselves were to present the prior-elect. It seems that the canons could act quickly and effectively when there were vacancies. In 1373 the took little more than a week to bury the old prior and elect the next.

Generally the canons resided at the priory itself, as the main granges were all fairly close. This saved them from the frequent complaints about sleeping alone that were levelled against the canons of larger houses with more dispersed estates, notably nearby Lilleshall Abbey. They stayed elsewhere only when required to serve as priests at one of the priory's churches. This seems to have happened mainly during the ravages of the Black Death in the mid-14th century and during subsequent outbreaks of the plague. In 1351 Brother Thomas de Eton was presented to Sutton Maddock church by the priory: although presented by the priory, the priest was generally a member of the secular clergy. Similarly at Loppington, impropriated by the priory in 1232, canons were appointed vicar in 1374 and 1377.

There was sometimes praise for the quality of the monastic life at Wombridge. Bishop Alexander de Stavenby alluded to the “praiseworthy conversation” and “poverty” of the canons as reasons for handing over Loppington church to the priory. Nevertheless, episcopal visitations resulted in complaints of preoccupation with secular matters. About 1315, Bishop Walter Langton, hardly a saint, forbade Prior Philip, to sell corrodies (essentially annuities in kind) without permission from either the bishop or his own chapter. He ordered that Brother Thomas de Broughton, who was apparently acting as a lawyer, be recalled to the priory; that a chamberlain be appointed to deal with the canons' vestments; that rules on silent periods, exclusion of women and care of the sick be enforced more thoroughly. He threatened excommunication in case of non-compliance. The house had no reputation for learning. The zealous Bishop Roger Northburgh, on a visitation of 1324, was mild in his criticisms, compared with his strictures at other Augustinian houses in the county. However, Brother Thomas was still running Roger Corbet's manorial courts and the cellarer was failing to eat with the canons, dining instead with the guests. However, the priory was solvent. On a visit to Worfield in the previous year, Northburgh had approved the prior selling a corrody to a chaplain, Henry of Tong. In 1325, however, Northburgh had to intervene in a serious breach of discipline. Brother Roger of Eyton had pretended to embark on a pilgrimage but had actually gone off to live a secular life, in contravention of his monastic vows: the bishop accepted his submission and arranged his readmission and penance.

Little is known of liturgical life in the priory. It is clear that there was a considerable amount of activity around chantries. The Dunstanville chantry was funded by income from mills, as was that of the Haleston or Haughton family, vassals of the Dunstanvilles, who in 1284 yielded up their mill to the priory in settlement of a suit for novel disseisin, on condition that they be permitted to nominate a canon to conduct services for their souls and those of various other barons, including Sir Robert Burnell, the father of Robert Burnell, the Lord Chancellor.

Tomb of Thomas Forster, 16th century Prior of Wombridge (mentioned 1510), Warden of Tong College (resigned 1515) and Vicar of Shifnal. St Andrew's Church, Shifnal.

Although apparently short-lived, the agreement with the Halestons was typical of successive priors' steadiness in pursuit of small but useful gains. This was particularly evident at Uppington, where Roger Mussun died leaving his lands to a widow and nine daughters. Eyton comments: “No story of feudal coheirship can be more intricate than that of the descent of Roger Mussun's nine daughters.” His detailed tracing of the story shows Wombridge priory acquiring small parcels of land and privileges from the holdings of each of the nine lines coheiresses by numerous methods over more than a century: purchase, gifts, opportunistic lawsuits, persuasion. More than 200 items in the cartulary document this steady accretion of property and privilege. Finally almost the whole Mussun inheritance was in its hands, creating a compact and economical estate. There remained only the issue of Uppington church, where the Priory contested the right to certain tithes with portionary priest of Wroxeter church. This must have been a delicate matter, as Wroxeter was a special interest of the FitzAlan family and belonged to Haughmond Abbey. Wombridge won its case in a hearing at Chester in 1293 but a further complication with another portioner had to be settled before the court of the Archbishop of Canterbury as late as 1346.

Wombridge was run in an economical way and, despite its small resources, never faced the financial difficulties of some of the other houses in the county. In 1519 Prior Thomas Forster was able to lend £40 to Lilleshall Abbey. Only a few lay people were paid to service the needs of the community: in 1536 just a steward, one William Charlton who was paid just £1 for his services, a court steward, a couple of bailiffs and a rent collector. By 1535, all the estates were let, rather than operated by the canons, except for the demesne at Wombridge. Here there were two coal pits, bringing in £5 annually, and also a small ironworks, worth 13s. 4.

== Dissolution and after ==
The Valor Ecclesiasticus of 1535 put a value of £72 15. 8d. on the priory. Although it was solvent, it fell well short of the £200 threshold for continuation. The priory was dissolved in 1536. The prior, William Prowde, was given a pension of £11. The contents were sold off for a total of £140 9s. 3¾d., while the roof lead and bells raised £30 5s. The estates were leased in their entirety to William Abbot for 20 years, after which the reversion was sold to James Leveson, who also paid off Abbot's lease, thus becoming outright owner. In 1547, shortly before he died, Leveson sold the Wombridge demesne lands, about 96 acres, to William Charlton, the former priory steward, who had been acting as bailiff of the lands. However, Leveson reserved the coal mines for himself.

Charlton was the owner until his death, 20 years later. He seems to have lived in the priory gatehouse, which became Wombridge Hall. By now an important figure in the county, he was knight of the shire for Shropshire in the parliament of April 1554, the second of Queen Mary's reign. His successor at Wombridge was his son, Robert, although he had more illustrious descendants through his younger son, Richard. In the 17th century the priory church was in use as a coach house and later as a cattle pound. By the end of the century, masonry from the priory had been used at Apley Castle, perhaps to repair Civil War damage. Parts of the buildings were included in Wombridge Farm, which was demolished in 1965 to make way for the present residential estate of Wombridge.

Remains of the priory buildings remained visible until the 19th century but are now hidden beneath the churchyard. They were excavated in the 1930s. In 2011 they were uncovered again, under the direction of Dr Malcolm Hislop. A further archaeological excavation was carried out with volunteer labour, supervised by Martin Cook, in the following year.
