= Mark Nicholson =

Mark Nicholson may refer to:

- Osymyso, real name Mark Nicholson, British musician and DJ
- Mark Nicholson (filmmaker), Australian filmmaker and politician of One Nation
- Mark Nicholson (politician) (1818–1889), pastoralist and politician in colonial Victoria, Australia
- Mark Nicholson (footballer), English footballer
- Mark Nicholson (Home and Away)

== See also ==
- Mark Nicolson, American tenor opera singer
