= Telford Theatre =

Events venue in Oakengates, Shropshire, England

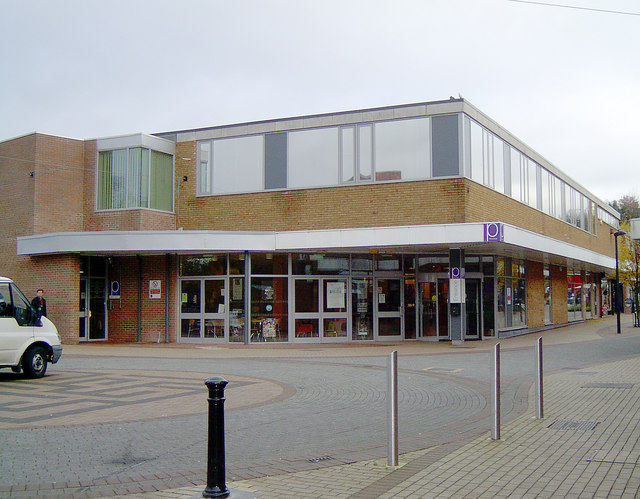
- The building in 2008

- Shown in Shropshire
- 52.6958°N 2.4510°W
- Location: Limes Walk, Oakengates

History
- Built: 1968

Site notes
- Architect: Maurice Day
- Architectural style: Modern style
- Website: Official website

Telford Theatre, formerly Oakengates Town Hall, is an events venue in Limes Walk in the town of Oakengates in Shropshire, England.

== History ==
Following significant population growth, largely associated with the coal mining and iron ore industries, an urban district council was established for Oakengates in 1898. By the mid-20th century, the council had established its offices and chambers in Stafford Road, which it retained as its base until local government re-organisation in 1974. In the 1960s, civic leaders decided that the area needed a public events venue. The site they selected had been occupied by the Great Western Nail Works operated by John Maddock & Co.

The new building was designed by Maurice Day in the modern style, built by Pat Smith & Sons (Oakengates) Limited in concrete, brick and glass and was officially opened by the jockey, Sir Gordon Richards, as "Oakengates Town Hall" on 25 May 1968. The design of the two-storey building involved a long main frontage facing southeast onto Limes Walk with a canted main entrance at the south corner of the building. There was a large canopy projected out over the pavement along the southwest and southeast frontages.

The building became a popular venue for concerts: the rock band, Fleetwood Mac, performed there in May 1969 and the rock and roll band, Showaddywaddy, made the first of several visits in February 1983. As one of the few large events venues in the area, it also became a preferred location for meetings of Telford and Wrekin Council.

A large auditorium was added, with work starting in 1983, and, following further re-modelling, it reopened as "Oakengates Theatre" in 1989. After completion of a further programme of refurbishment works, the building was re-opened by the comedian, Julian Clary, as "The Place" in 2005. The branding was refreshed again and it was renamed "Telford Theatre" in 2022. In 2024, it closed for alterations, to enlarge the main auditorium to seat 750 people, and create a new studio theatre, bar and dining area.
