= Oakengates =

Town in Shropshire, England

Coordinates: 52.695°N 2.451°W

- Town and civil parish
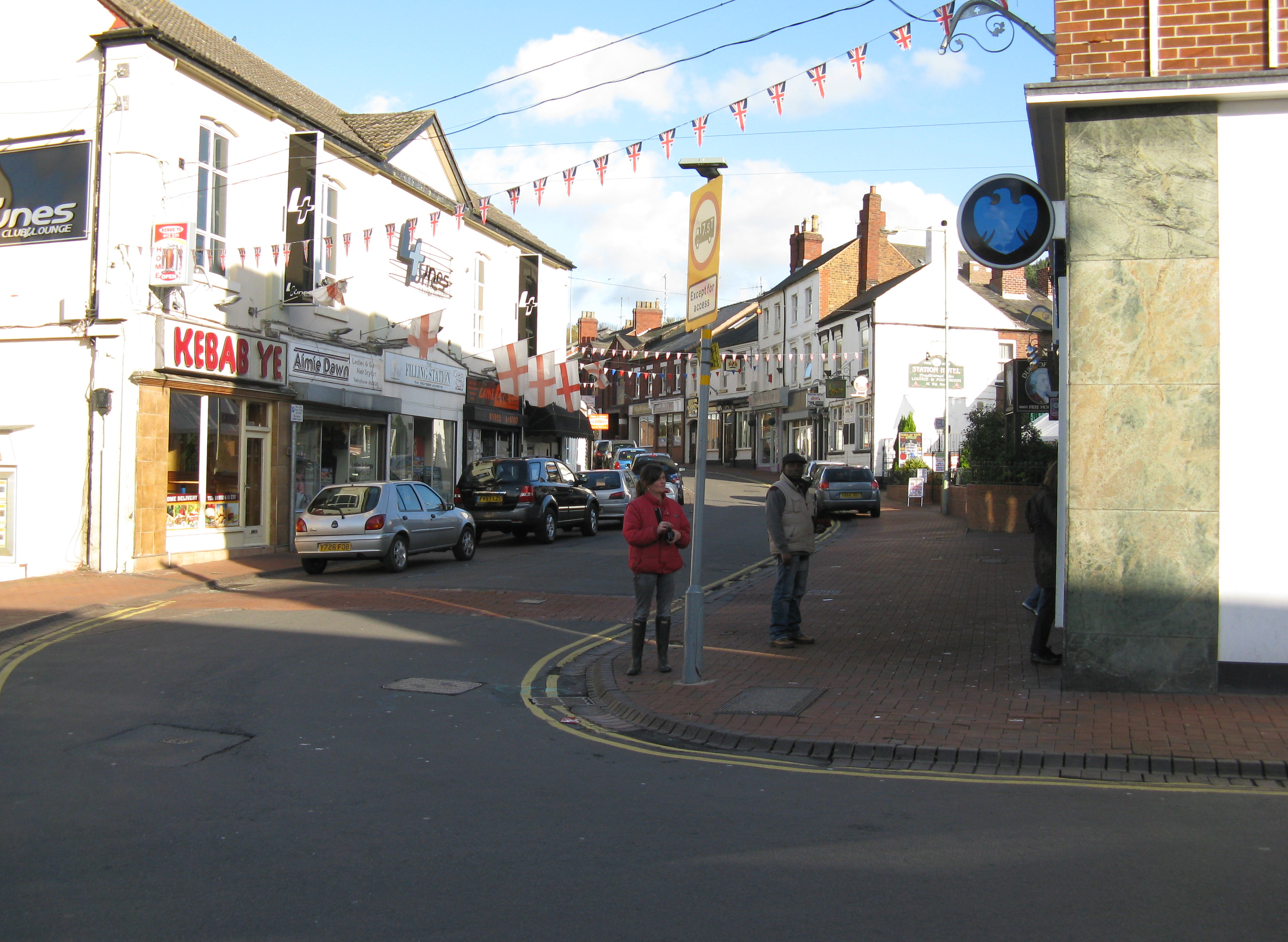
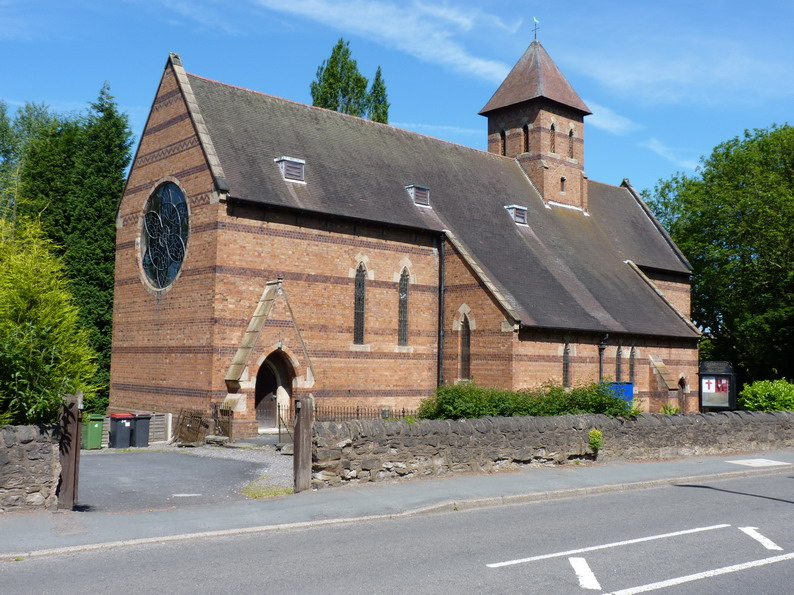
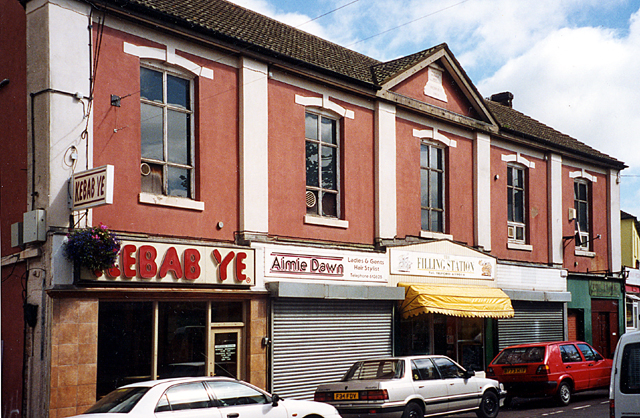
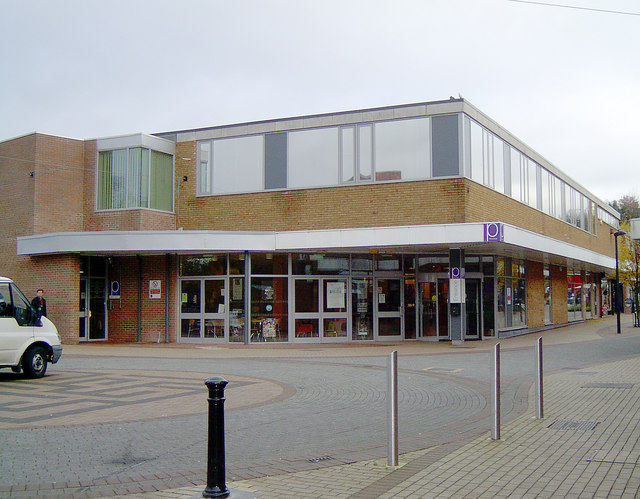
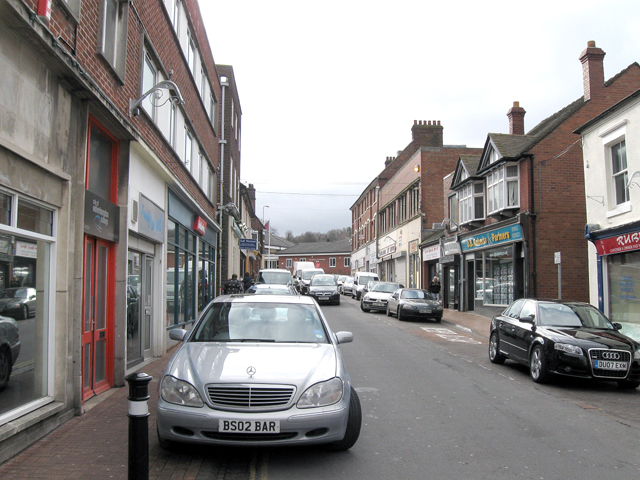
- From the top clockwise: Oakengates Market Street, Old Town Hall, Oxford Street, Telford Theatre and Holy Trinity Church

- Location within Shropshire
- Population: 8,517
- OS grid reference: SJ696109
- Civil parish: Oakengates
- Unitary authority: Telford and Wrekin
- Ceremonial county: Shropshire
- Region: West Midlands
- Country: England
- Sovereign state: United Kingdom
- Areas of the town: List: Beveley; Hollyhurst; Ketley Bank; Wombridge
- Post town: TELFORD
- Postcode district: TF2
- Dialling code: 01952
- Police: West Mercia
- Fire: Shropshire
- Ambulance: West Midlands
- UK Parliament: Telford
- Website: Official website

Oakengates shown within Telford in Green.

Oakengates is a historic market town and civil parish in the borough of Telford and Wrekin, Shropshire, England. The town's parish population was recorded as 8,517 in the 2001 census.

== Etymology ==
The name is not derived from "oak" or "gates" but is derived from the Ancient Brythonic name for the valley which was Usc-con, meaning The Lake (Usc (water)) and the confluence (Cond) of two streams (see Cartlidge), and from the Old Norse gata, path; see gh- in Indo-European roots. meaning boundary or Road. So Usc-con gait is at the Road at the vale of Usc-con. The Vales and Gates of Usc-Con: A history of Oakengates was written by local historian Reverend J.E.G. Cartlidge whose name is commemorated in the name of the retirement home Cartlidge House.

== History ==
=== Roman period ===
In 48 A.D, Watling Street, a pretty important road for transportation and travel, was built by the Romans. The road passed directly through what is nowadays known as Oakengates and was surrounded by various settlements that stretched up to Redhill, where a roman fort had been strategically built.

=== Medieval Period ===
The parish of Oakengates (and thus the medieval town of Oakengates) emerged from the demesnes of the Augustinian priory of St. Leonard at Wombridge in 1135, thanks to Lord William De Hadley. The town encompassed of the majority of the Wombridge Parish area.

By 1269, the bounds of Wombridge ancient parish had been established, corresponding to those of Wombridge priory's demesne.

In 1414, Oakengates became an established settlement managed by the Priory.

=== Modern Period ===
In 1553, the first Bailiff was appointed to oversee Oakengates and the priory of St. Leonard. This was a direct consequence of the ‘Suppression of Religious Houses Act 1535’ passed by the Parliament under the directives of Henry VIII, which essentially advocated for a national campaign in order to seize land, titles, and religious houses from the Church. This led to the Priory of St Leonards appointing a Bailiff who resided within Oakengates.

=== Contemporary Period ===
Various industries and mining facilities popped up starting from the 1600s-1700s, especially in the area of Ketley Bank.

By the mid 19th Century, the town started to grow, due to the creation of a local market and various railways.

By 1968, the modern-day Telford New Town named after civil engineer and architect Thomas Telford incorporated the county's historic market towns in the area, including Oakengates.

== Transport ==
In the late 18th century the Ketley Canal was constructed to carry coal and ironstone from Oakengates to Ketley works. The canal has long since fallen into disuse and little trace of it can be found today. The first boat lift in Britain was an experimental one built at Oakengates in 1794 by Robert Weldon of Lichfield. A full-scale version was to be built on the Somerset Coal Canal at Rowley Bottom near Combe Hay, but the lift jammed and failed while being demonstrated and the construction was abandoned.

The Shrewsbury to Wolverhampton railway line runs through the town and there is a station and a tunnel (Oakengates Tunnel).

Oakengates was also served by the Coalport Branch Line and had a second station called Oakengates Market Street railway station which closed in 1952. It is now Station Hill with only the goods shed still standing.

== Industry ==
Shadrach Fox ran the Wombridge Iron Works in Oakengates and with Abraham Darby was involved in experiments on methods of producing pig iron in a blast furnace fuelled by coke rather than charcoal. In the field of ferrous metallurgy this was a major step forward in the production of iron as a raw material for the Industrial Revolution. In 1701 he placed his brother in charge of the blast furnace, at Wombridge to which Isaac Hawkins supplied a large quantity of coal and ironstone, which suggests that they already smelted iron with coke there - a major technological breakthrough which is now solely commemorated at nearby Coalbrookdale.

The town had a considerable manufacturing sector well into the 20th century and one of the products of this can still be seen at the Museum of Power in Langford, Essex. This has, still in working order, what is believed to be the last steam engine built and installed by the Lilleshall Company Ltd. It was commissioned on 13 January 1931.

== Church ==
The present Church of England parish church of Holy Trinity was built in 1854, when a separate ecclesiastical parish had been created from parts of the older parishes of Wombridge and Shifnal.

== Amenities ==
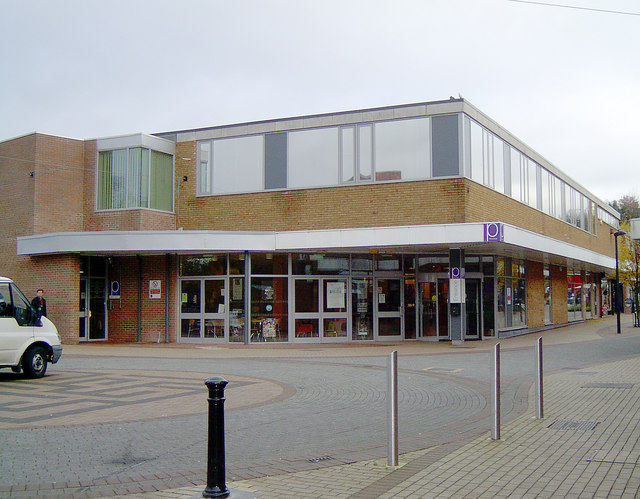
Telford Theatre

Oakengates has Telford Theatre, which was originally opened in 1968 as Oakengates' Town Hall by champion jockey Sir Gordon Richards, after whose Derby-winning horse is named one of its rooms, the Pinza Suite. Nearby are the town council's headquarters and the United Reformed/Methodist church.

Oakengates' main public open space is Hartshill Park, originally created as the Oakengates Sports and Recreation Ground. by levelling a coal mine spoil heap. Opened in 1927, it remains a valuable facility including bowling green and tennis courts. In 1928 the present park gates were unveiled as a war memorial to local men who died serving in World War I whose names are listed on the gate piers, the World War II casualties being listed on outlying pillars.

Central Park business park is sited on part of the former Priorslee Furnace Works and Eagle Iron Works. The business park includes office space, retail outlets, a nursery and a cafe.

== Governance ==
From the 2023 local elections, Oakengates civil parish consists of four wards named Oakengates and Wombridge, Hollyhurst, Middlepool, and North.

Before the formation of the District of The Wrekin (Telford) and later the Borough of Telford and The Wrekin, the Urban District of Oakengates comprised Oakengates, Wrockwardine Wood, St. George's, Priorslee, Snedshill, The Nabb, Wombridge and Trench, and always had a Labour council.

== Sport ==
Oakengates Athletic F.C., which in 2018 merged into Wellington Amateurs, played in the Shropshire County Premier Football League. In January 2024 the club was renamed Telford Town.

== Notable people ==
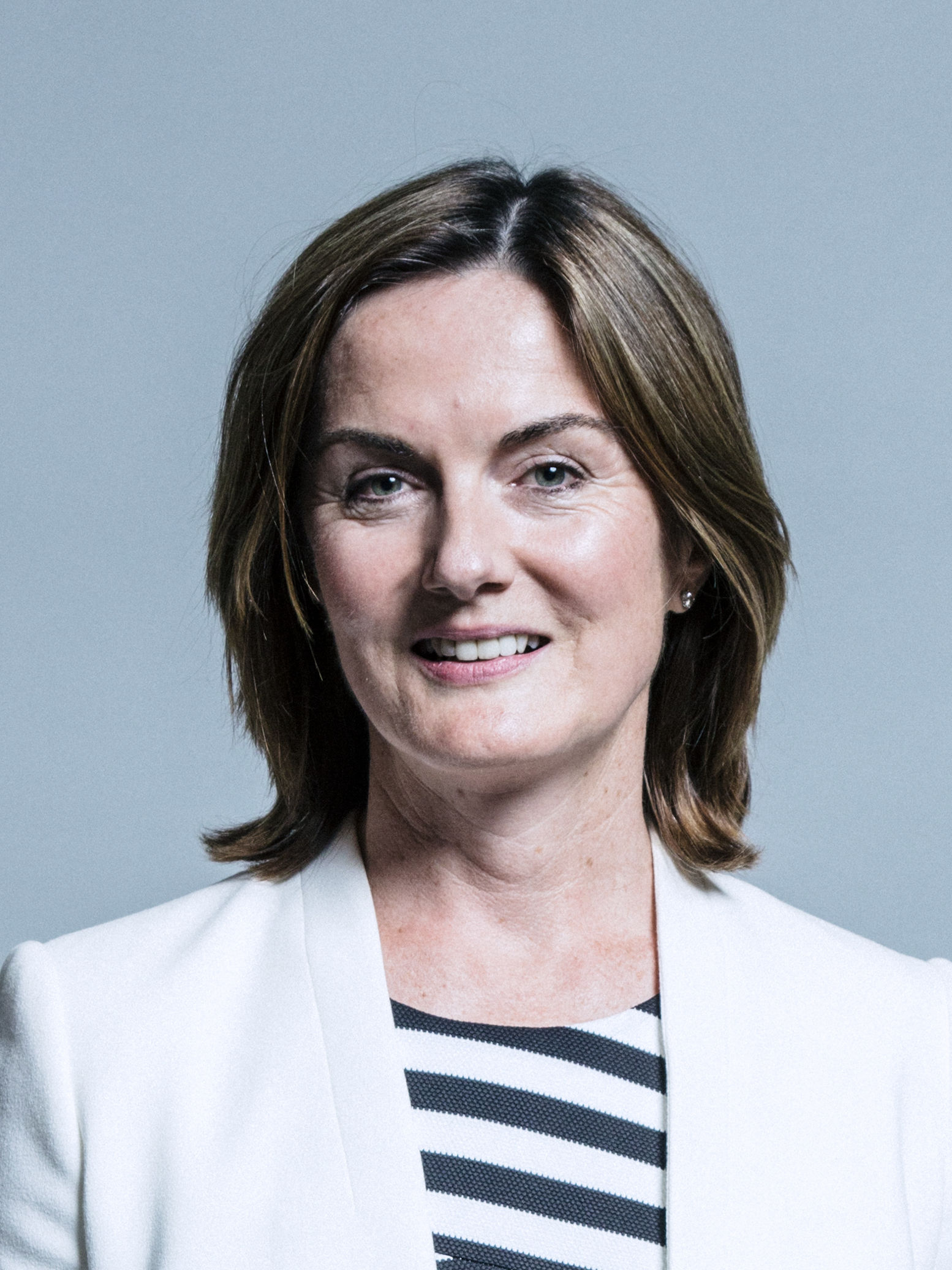
Lucy Allan, 2017

- Lucy Allan (born 1964), Conservative politician, MP for Telford 2015-2024, lived in Oakengates.
- David Wright (born 1966), Labour politician, MP for Telford 2001–2015, born locally .

=== Sport ===
- George Swift (1870–1956), footballer who played over 270 games, (notably for Wolves winning the 1893 FA Cup Final), later manager of Chesterfield and Southampton, born at Oakengates.
- Mark Nicholson (1871-1941), footballer who played 56 games for West Brom winning the 1892 FA Cup Final, later manager of First Vienna F.C., born at Oakengates.
- Will Osborne (1875–1942), Welsh rugby union international player, settled at The Nabb.
- Jack Elkes (1894–1972), footballer, played over 370 games, born at Snedshill.
- Harry Chambers (1896–1949), footballer, played 397 games and 8 for England, settled locally; buried at Wombridge.
- Tommy Jones (1907–1980), footballer, born locally and settled there after playing about 300 games, kept a local shop.
- Johnny Hancocks (1919–1994), footballer, played 373 games mainly for Wolves born locally and settled there.
- Doug Hayward (1920–2008), footballer played 261 games, mainly for Newport County A.F.C.

== See also ==
- Listed buildings in Oakengates
