= Priorslee =

Village in Shropshire, England

Coordinates: 52.691277°N 2.419031°W

- Village
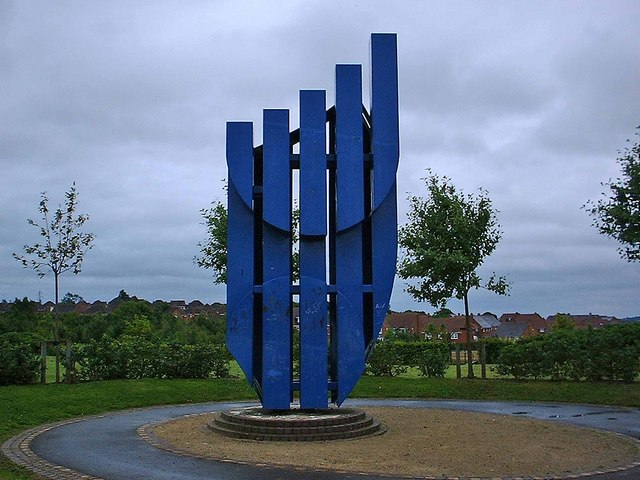
- The Blue Hand sculpture, Priorslee

- Location within Shropshire
- OS grid reference: SJ715100
- Civil parish: St George's and Priorslee
- Unitary authority: Telford and Wrekin
- Ceremonial county: Shropshire
- Region: West Midlands
- Country: England
- Sovereign state: United Kingdom
- Post town: TELFORD
- Postcode district: TF2
- Dialling code: 01952
- Police: West Mercia
- Fire: Shropshire
- Ambulance: West Midlands
- UK Parliament: Telford

Priorslee is a large village in the Telford and Wrekin borough in Shropshire, England. It forms part of the St George's and Priorslee civil parish alongside Central Park, Redhill, Snedshill and St George's.

== History ==
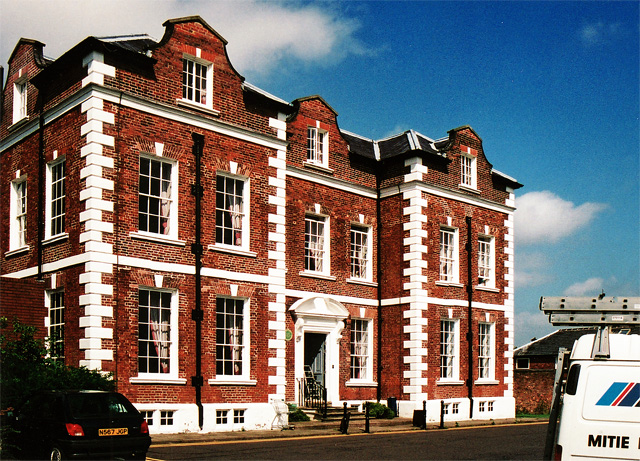
Priorslee Hall

The village occupies an area that was home to a Roman settlement at nearby Red Hill. Roman coins were found in the surrounding area. Priors-Lee was formerly a chapelry in the parish of Shifnal, on 1 April 1898 Priors Lee became a separate civil parish, on 1 April 1934 the parish was abolished to form Oakengates. In 1931 the parish had a population of 2644. It later became part of Telford alongside neighbouring villages and towns between the 1960s and 1970s.

By the beginning of the Industrial Revolution, Priorslee grew rapidly following the arrival of both the Lilleshall Company in nearby Oakengates and the opening of the Wolverhampton - Shrewsbury Railway. It alongside neighbouring St George's grew rapidly for workers of the company and railway.

== St Peter's Church ==
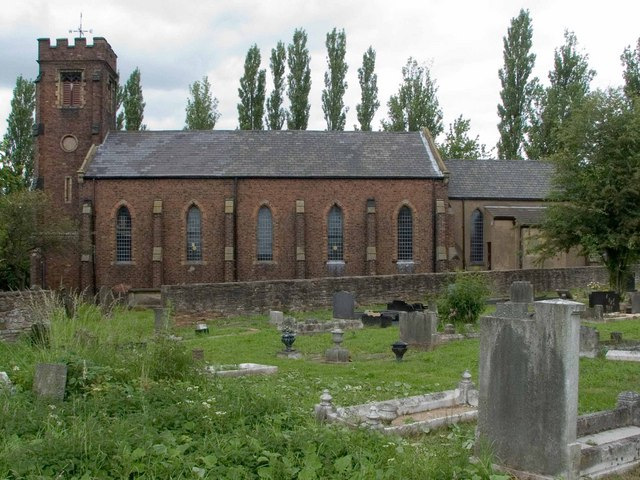
St Peter's Church, Priorslee. Currently closed as of 2022.

Until 1838, a chapel occupied the site of the present-day church. It was demolished and replaced by the church between 1825 and 1827. The church was then dedicated to Saint Peter and given Grade II listing.

The church contains three war memorials: an oak pulpit with marble plaque listing parishioners who died serving in the World War I, with an additional plaque listing names from the World War II, and another plaque on the north wall to 2nd Lieutenant Walter Crooke of the Royal Flying Corps, killed in action 1917, which was given by colleagues from his local civilian employer, the Lilleshall Company. The latter company is mentioned on a number of other memorials in the church. The churchyard contains the war graves of four British Army soldiers of World War I.

The church was closed in 2022 due to repairs needed to the building and is likely to be declared redundant by the Diocese of Lichfield.

== Present day ==
Priorslee is a predominantly residential village with some local shopping amenities and is also close Stafford Park which is a mix of industrial and retail.

Priorslee is the location of Telford's Sikh Gurdwara, in Whitechapel Way.

For education there is a primary school and a secondary school (Holy Trinity Academy). The Telford Innovation Campus of the University of Wolverhampton, 18 miles (29 km) from Wolverhampton, is on a greenfield site in the grounds of Priorslee Hall – a grade-II listed 18th Century redbrick mansion. Opened in 1994, the campus houses facilities for engineering, built environment, business, computing and social work. Halls of residence for just under 500 students are located on campus. The campus is home to the e-Innovation Centre which provides startup companies and small and medium enterprises with business accommodation and funded support from a team of IT consultants, giving them access to the university's IT facilities, expertise and resources.

== Transport ==
The village is close to the Wolverhampton - Shrewsbury line with the nearest railway stations being Oakengates and nearby Shifnal. Historically, the village was served by the nearby Stafford - Shrewsbury Line with a station in nearby Trench and Donnington. The village is also close to the route of the original Watling Street which runs until the Lime Kiln Bank Roundabout. It then mostly disappears under the many areas of Telford until it resumes past nearby Wellington. There are also regular buses connecting the village to Telford, Shifnal, Newport, Shrewsbury, Wellington and Stafford.
