= Metallum Martis =

1665 book by Dud Dudley

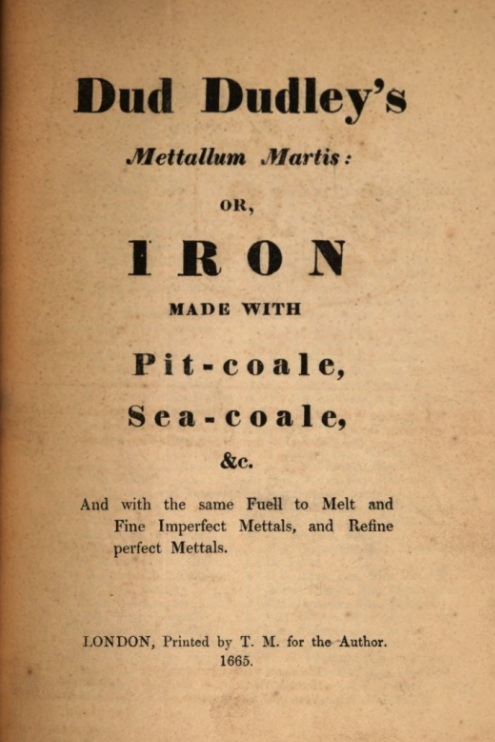
- Author: Dud Dudley
- Subject: Metallurgy
- Publication date: 1665

Metallum Martis is a 1665 book by the English metallurgist Dud Dudley. It is the earliest known reference to the use of coal in metallurgical smelting. The book is also referred to as Iron made with Pit-Coale, Sea-Coale, &c. And with the same Fuell to Melt and Fine Imperfect Mettals, And Refine perfect Mettals.

Dudley provides a geological map of Dudley Castle where he correctly identifies the order and geographic layout of the strata of coal and ironstone under survey. It is one of the earliest recorded geological maps.

The book explains that both Oliver Cromwell and Charles II of England supported attempts to smelt iron with coal. In 1660, Dudley himself applied to Charles II for a patent, claiming that he could perfect the mastery of making iron with pit-coal or sea-coal.

== Use of coal in ironworks and furnaces in the West Midlands ==
Many attendant difficulties had to be overcome before this fuel could be applied to the purpose of smelting iron. Dudley does not describe in his book how he was using coal, only that he was. In so doing, he described his use successively of an ironworks on Pensnett Chase and at Cradley, of an industrial furnace at Himley, and of a furnace at Hasco Bridge near Gornal.

== Coal debris found in heaps ==
Dudley does mention several things that indicate what he was doing. The coal he used was the small pieces and slack which were "little or of no use in that inland country" and so brought in no money. This coal debris was left in heaps and "crowded moist slack heat naturally, and kindle in the middle of these great heaps, often sets the coal works on fire" and that "Also from these sulphurous heaps, mixed with ironstone (for out of many of the same pits is gotten much ironstone or mine), the fires heating vast quantities of water, passing through these soughs or adits becometh as hot as the bath at Bath".

== Support for iron smelting experiments by Oliver Cromwell and Charles II ==
Dudley describes two rival attempts to smelt iron with coal instigated by the Parliamentarians during the Civil War and the Interregnum. Dudley visited both sites and having examined their furnaces and production methods, when asked his opinion, informed the proprietors that they would fail. The first attempt was by Captain Buck, with the backing of many parliamentary officers including Oliver Cromwell, with technical help from Edward Dagney, an Italian. In the second attempt in the late 1656–67 by Captain John Copley also failed despite Dudley, at no charge, improving the efficiency of Copley's bellows. Dudley reapplied for a patent from Charles II of England, in 1660 stating "and seeing no man able to perform the mastery of making of iron with pit-coal or sea-coal, ... [without my] laudable inventions the author was, and is, unwilling [that they] should fall to the ground and die with him".

== Geological map of Dudley Castle and its vicinity ==
A significant feature of his great work Metallum Martis is a map showing Dudley Castle where he correctly identifies the order and geographic layout of strata of coal and ironstone under survey.

Considered to be the earliest of recorded geological maps, Metallum Martis marks a turning point in the evolution of scientific rationale concerning the recording and interpretation of geological information. It is considered to have been made at Castle Hill in Dudley by Dud Dudley in 1665.
