= Listed buildings in Oakengates =

Oakengates is a civil parish in the district of Telford and Wrekin, Shropshire, England. The parish contains three listed buildings that are recorded in the National Heritage List for England. All the listed buildings are designated at Grade II, the lowest of the three grades, which is applied to "buildings of national importance and special interest". The parish is mainly residential, and the listed buildings consist of an 18th-century house, a church, and war memorial gates.

== Buildings ==
Name and location	Photograph	Date	Notes
Bank House; 52.68976°N 2.46247°W		1721	A brick house with stone dressings, quoins, string courses, and a tile roof. There are two storeys, five bays, and a one-bay extension to the right. The windows are sashes with keyblocks, and there is a wide doorway with an open porch.
Holy Trinity Church; 52.69250°N 2.45629°W		1855	The church is in yellow brick with banding and diapering in red brick, stone dressings, and a tile roof. It consists of a nave with a gabled south porch, short north and south aisles, and a chancel with chapels. On the chancel arch is a bell turret with a pyramidal roof, the windows are lancets, and at the west end is a wheel window.
War Memorial Gates; 52.69522°N 2.45457°W		1928	The gates are at the eastern entrance to Hartshill Park. They consist of a pair of carriage gates flanked by pedestrian gates in cast and wrought iron with stone piers and flanking stone walls ending in piers. Above the central gates is an inscribed overthrow. The piers and walls have chamfered rustication, and the piers have recessed panels. The panels in the central piers contain bronze plaques with the names of those lost in the first World War. In the outer piers are slate plaques with more names from the First World War, and the names of those lost in the Second World War.
