= Listed buildings in St George's and Priorslee =

St George's and Priorslee is a civil parish in the district of Telford and Wrekin, Shropshire, England. The parish contains nine listed buildings that are recorded in the National Heritage List for England. All the listed buildings are designated at Grade II, the lowest of the three grades, which is applied to "buildings of national importance and special interest". The parish is a suburb of the town of Telford. Its listed buildings consist of houses and associated structures, a farmhouse, two churches, and a former cottage hospital, later used as a school.

== Buildings ==
Name and location	Photograph	Date	Notes
Priorslee Hall; 52.68402°N 2.42449°W		Early 18th century	A former country house, later used for other purposes. It is in brick with stone dressings, quoins, string courses, a parapet, and hipped slate roofs. There are two storeys and attics, and seven bays, the outer two bays on each side projecting. In the centre is a doorway with a moulded architrave, and an open segmental pediment on console brackets. The windows are sashes with keystones, and in the attics are three dormers with Dutch gables.
York House; 52.68282°N 2.43007°W	—	18th century	A house in painted brick with a tile roof. There are two storeys and an L-shaped plan, consisting of a three-bay south wing, and a gabled wing projecting to the north. In the angle is a two-storey porch with corner pilasters and a hipped roof, and the doorway has panelled pilasters and a hood on console brackets. Most of the windows are sashes with rusticated voussoir heads.
Dovecote, Priorslee Hall Farm; 52.68471°N 2.42444°W	—	18th to 19th century	The dovecote is in red brick and has a square plan. It has a pyramidal tile roof, and is surmounted by a wooden lantern with a weathervane.
The Red House; 52.68297°N 2.42905°W	—	Early 19th century	A red brick house on a stone plinth, with a cornice, a sill band, and a hipped slate roof. There are three storeys and three bays. In the centre of the front is a circular porch in a semicircular recess with Tuscan columns, an entablature, and a hemispherical dome. The windows are sashes, those in the middle bay with architraves, and the one in the middle floor with a cornice.
The Woodhouse Farmhouse; 52.68810°N 2.41167°W	—	Early 19th century	A stuccoed brick house with a slate roof. There are two storeys, and three bays divided by giant pilasters. The central doorway has pilasters, a semicircular fanlight, and an open pediment, and the windows are sashes.
St Peter's Church; 52.68717°N 2.44024°W		1825–27	The church replaced an earlier church on the site, and the chancel was added in 1903. It is built in brown and pink brick, and consists of a nave, a lower chancel, and a west tower. The tower has diagonal buttresses and an embattled parapet.
Lodge Row; 52.68360°N 2.42969°W		Mid 19th century	A terrace of three brick cottages, with a string course and a slate roof. There are two storeys and ten bays. The windows are two-light casements with lozenge-shaped panes and cast iron glazing bars, and hood moulds, and the doorways also have hood moulds.
St George's Church; 52.69529°N 2.43178°W		1861–62	The church was designed by G. E. Street, and additions were made to the tower in 1928–29. The church is built in Lilleshall limestone with dressings in Grinshill sandstone. It consists of a nave with a clerestory, north and south aisles, a chancel, a north vestry, and a south tower. The tower incorporates a porch, and has a clock face, an openwork parapet with corner pinnacles, and a pyramidal roof. Most of the windows are lancets, the west window has three lights, and the east window has five lancets.
Gower Street School; 52.69709°N 2.43709°W		1873	A cottage hospital, later a school, and then a youth centre, it is in red brick with stone dressings and a tile roof. In the centre is a block with two storeys and three bays, and this is flanked by single-storey wings. The central block has a mansard roof with cast iron cresting, and contains a porch with an arched entrance, above which are dormers with hipped roofs, and a bellcote. The outer wings have mullioned and transomed windows, and further out are paired gables containing lancet windows.
