= Mark Nicholson (footballer) =

English footballer (1871–1941)

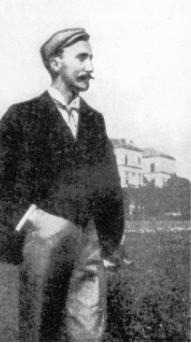
- Nicholson in 1902

Personal information
- Full name: Mark Nicholson
- Date of birth: 6 Mar 1871
- Place of birth: Oakengates, England
- Date of death: 3 July 1941 (aged 69–70)
- Position: Full-back

Senior career*
Years	Team	Apps	(Gls)
1890–1891	Oswestry Town		
1891–1894	West Bromwich Albion	56	(0)
1894–1895	Luton Town		
1895–1896	Cairo		
1897–1900	First Vienna		
Total		56	(0)

Managerial career
- 1897–1900: First Vienna
- * Club domestic league appearances and goals

Mark Nicholson (6 March 1871 – 3 July 1941) was an English football player and manager who played as a full-back in the Football League for West Bromwich Albion. He was instrumental in establishing organised football in Austria.

== Career ==
- 1889–1891: Oswestry Town (player)
- 1891–1894: West Bromwich Albion (player)
- 1894–1897: Luton Town (player)
- 1897–1900: First Vienna FC (player, later player-coach)

== Honours ==
West Bromwich Albion

- FA Cup: 1891–92

Vienna (player-coach)

- Challenge Cup: 1898–99, 1899–1900
