= Holy Trinity Academy, Telford =

Holy Trinity Academy

Location
- Teece Drive; Priorslee; Telford, Shropshire, TF2 9SQ; England; 52.684°N 2.4162°W

Information
- Type: Voluntary aided school
- Religious affiliations: Roman Catholic/ Church of England
- Established: 1 September 2015
- Closed: 1/1/2025
- Local authority: Telford and Wrekin
- Department for Education URN: 142067 Tables
- Ofsted: Reports
- Headteacher: Angus Neal
- Gender: Mixed
- Age: 11 to 18
- Website: https://www.holytrinity.academy

Holy Trinity Academy is a mixed secondary school located in the Priorslee area of Telford in the English county of Shropshire.

The school was opened in September 2015 in a new campus, replacing Blessed Robert Johnson Catholic College in Wellington. Holy Trinity Academy is a joint Roman Catholic and Church of England school, administered by the Roman Catholic Diocese of Shrewsbury and the Church of England Diocese of Lichfield.

A house system is used in the school and consists of 4 teams; Johnson, Liddell, Assisi and Fry.
