= Shadrach Fox =

English ironmaster (died before 1725)

Shadrach Fox (died before 1725) was the ironmaster who preceded Abraham Darby at Coalbrookdale.

Shadrach was probably the son of Captain Thomas Fox, who appears in the accounts of Philip Foley in 1669 as buying tough pig iron,

In the 1690s, Shadrach was renting the Coalbrookdale ironworks and supplying shot (for cannon) to the Board of Ordnance. He had some dispute with the Company for Making Iron with Pitcoal. His brother Thomas Fox had worked that company as founder near London, casting grenado shells and shot for the Board in 1693, after which Thomas became warden of the Fleet Prison, in which he stored 'bombs and grenado shells', probably ones empty of gunpowder.

In 1701 he placed his brother in charge of another blast furnace, at Wombridge to which Isaac Hawkins supplied a large quantity of coal and ironstone, which suggests that they smelted iron with coke. Unfortunately, Coalbrookdale Furnace blew up, not later than April 1703, and Thomas died not long after. Coalbrookdale Furnace remained derelict until it was restored by Abraham Darby in 1709.

After leaving Coalbrookdale, Shadrach had an interest in a corn mill near London and worked as a founder casting shells for contractors, probably supplying the East India Company. He was then recruited to go to Russia to enter the service of Peter the Great. He travelled by way of Archangel, but died in the course of his first winter in Russia, leaving a destitute widow in England and several children, of whom his son Mesech served as a soldier and later sought to recover his father's property (but there was none).
