= Uxacona =

Ancient Roman settlement in Shropshire, England

Coordinates: 52.69516°N 2.41121°W

Watling Street north of St Albans. The map shows the Roman towns established along Watling Street by the end of the first century AD.

Uxacona was a Romano-British settlement located at Redhill near present-day Telford, Shropshire, England.

The settlement lies at the highest point of the Roman Watling Street, approximately 11 Roman miles from Viroconium Cornoviorum (Wroxeter) to the west, and 11 miles from Pennocrucium (Penkridge) to the east. Its only documentary mention is in the 2nd century Antonine Itinerary.

The main settlement consisted of a small enclosure bisected by Watling Street, surrounded by a single ditch 3.20 m × 1.80 m (10.5 ft × 5.9 ft) and showing evidence of occupation from the early to the mid 4th century. To the north of the settlement lay a large single-ditched enclosure that may have been a military storage depot from the campaign of Quintus Veranius in AD 57 and a smaller double-ditched enclosure that may have been a signal station from the later 1st century.

The site is a scheduled monument, and also recorded on the Heritage at Risk register, the main risk being "Arable ploughing".

== Redhill ==
Uxacona is commonly referred to as being at Redhill or Red Hill, Shropshire. The placename "Redhill" has been applied to several locations in the vicinity of Uxacona. While Uxacona is divided between the parishes of Shifnal (south of Watling Street, east) in Shropshire Unitary Authority area, and Donnington and Muxton (north of Watling Street, west) and St. Georges and Priorslee (south of Watling Street, west) in Telford & Wrekin, the parish of Sheriffhales (north of Watling Street, east, in Shropshire UA) is said by its parish council to include Redhill, and includes Redhill Farm.

An area on the eastern outskirts of Telford town, in the parish of Donnington and Muxton, north of Watling Street and east of Redhill Way, is referred to as Redhill. Plans have been approved for 457 houses in this area, and for a supermarket, coffeeshop, other retail and charging station, and for a 66-bed care home.

On Ordnance Survey mapping at the 1:25,000 scale, "Redhill" appears both south-east and north-west of Uxocana, while on the larger scale OS mapping included in the NHLE listing, it appears within the scheduled area, near the spot height of 186m, and also due north of the site. On the "Granville Heritage Trail" leaflet produced by Telford & Wrekin Council, a map identifies "Redhill" as an area west of the A4640 road, which at that point is called "Redhill Way", while Redhill Primary Academy is south of the A5 road but east of the A4640.

Royal Mail includes "Redhill" in the postal addresses for the area of new housing but also for the Telford Crematorium adjacent to Uxacona, and Redhill Farm further east.

A trig point formerly marked the summit of Red Hill or Redhill on the A5 or Watling Street, but is reported to have been moved to a point on the driveway to Upper Woodhouse Farm, south of its original location.
