= Wombridge =

Former parish in Shropshire, England

Coordinates: 52°42′05″N 2°27′32″W

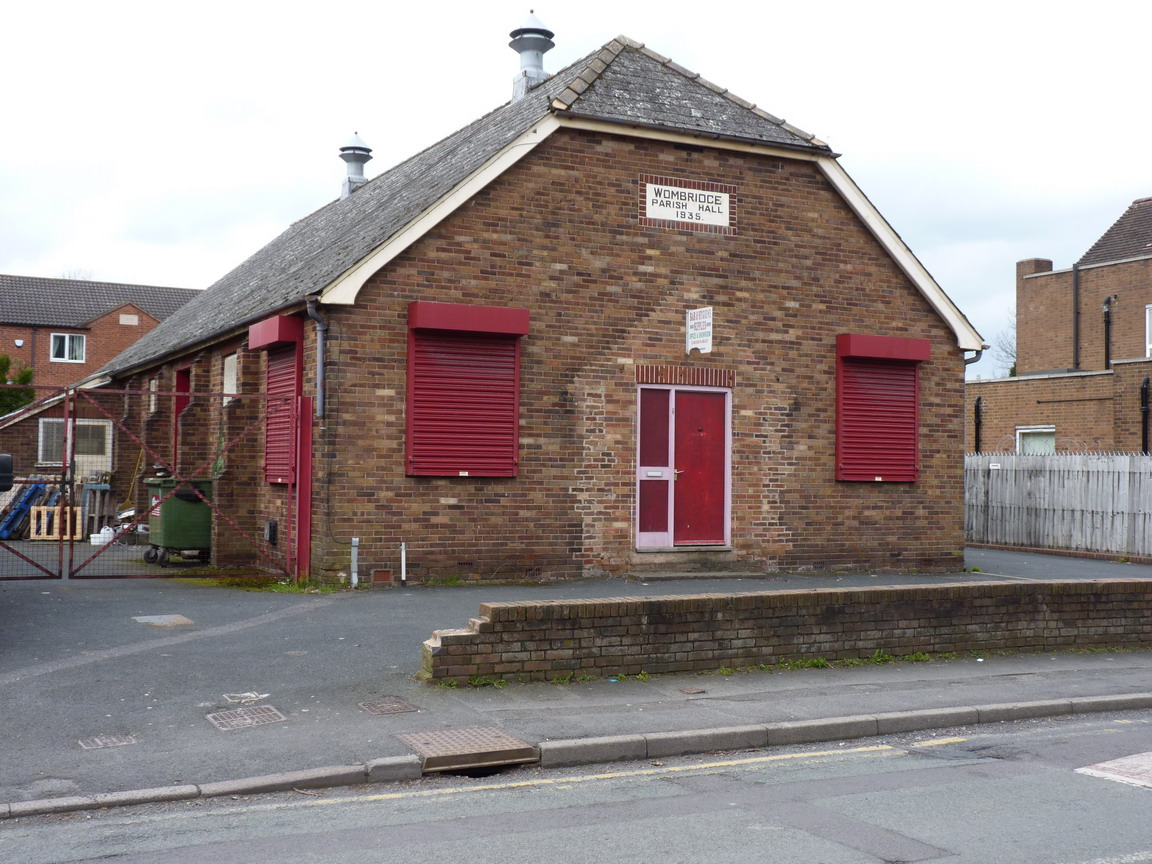
- The former 1935 parish hall

- Location within Shropshire
- Civil parish: Oakengates
- Unitary authority: Telford and Wrekin
- Ceremonial county: Shropshire
- Region: West Midlands
- Country: England
- Sovereign state: United Kingdom
- Police: West Mercia
- Fire: Shropshire
- Ambulance: West Midlands

Wombridge (alternatively known as Wambridge) is a settlement in the civil parish of Oakengates, in the Telford and Wrekin district of the ceremonial county of Shropshire, England. It is 4 miles (6.4 km) east of Wellington, 2 miles (3.2 km) northeast of Telford, and 16 miles (26 km) from Shrewsbury, covering 699 acres (283 ha). It was former a parish in the Wellington Division of the hundred of Bradford South.

In 1898, Shropshire County Council (via the Local Government Board) added the parish to Oakengates Urban District, which in its turn was replaced by the town of Telford, that was built as a new town in the 1960s. (Note: The statutory instrument was The Dawley New Town (Designation) Amendment (Telford) Order 1968.)

It is now an area in the borough of Telford and Wrekin, with a parish church and an eponymous primary school.

== History ==
It was the location of Wombridge Priory, Wombridge Colliery, and the Wombridge Iron Works.

It contained the junction of the Shrewsbury, Shropshire, and Marquess of Stafford canals and through it passed Watling Street and the Great Holyhead Road. The Shrewsbury Canal had a double inclined plane there, with a steam engine for drawing boats upwards, extending 223 yards (204 m) for a vertical rise of 75 feet (23 m).

It was 148 miles (238 km) by coach road from London, with letters delivered from there by 7:30 am in 1852.

Wombridge Parish Council ceased to exist in 1898, Shropshire County Council (via the Local Government Board) abolishing it and replacing it with Oakengates Urban District, which in its turn was replaced by the town of Telford, that was built as a new town in the 1960s. (Note: The statutory instrument was The Dawley New Town (Designation) Amendment (Telford) Order 1968.)

Wombridge Parish Council had expressed their objection to the merger on the grounds that Wombridge people would be made to pay for the new sewage systems in the rest of the urban district, the existing one at Oakengates being either ineffective or outright non-existent in parts of the parish and the one at Lilleshall using open ditches that passed through older housing. Because of this objection an inquiry had to be held, at Oakengates on 19 January 1898, wherefrom the Board concluded (in its report on several such inquiries) that "no sufficient grounds had been shown which would justify us in overruling the action of the County Councils".

The civil parish continued to exist as an urban parish until 1 April 1934 when it was abolished and merged with Oakengates. In 1931 the parish had a population of 3405.

=== Schools and religious buildings ===
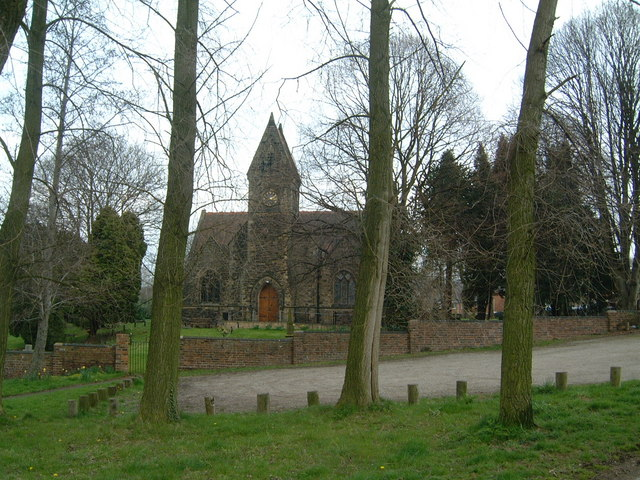
Wombridge Parish Church, seen in 2006

It is served by schools in neighbouring Oakengates, Telford and Wellington.

The parish church was the church of St Mary and St Leonard, near to which were the remains of a Augustinian priory that had been founded during the reign of Henry I by William Fitz-Alan and later dissolved. The parish curacy in 1837 amounted to a £800 royal bounty and a £1,200 parliamentary grant. The Churchyard holds eight graves which are in the care of the Commonwealth War Graves Commission.

=== Iron Works ===
The Wombridge Iron Works was established in 1818. The Wombridge Iron Company mined iron and coal. It produced puddled wire reels, screw and fencing rods, sheet iron for corrugating and galvanization, charcoal sheets, and tack sheets. In 1865 at a meeting of the Mechanical Engineers' Society of Birmingham, Henry Bennett of the Iron Company presented a description of the construction and operation of his new mechanized puddling machine, recording a coal usage for puddled iron of 28 long hundredweight per long ton (1.4 Mg/Mg) in the single furnace and to 17 long hundredweight per long ton (0.85 Mg/Mg) in the double furnace, when employing the machine.

The soil comprised sand and stiff clay. Industrial water supply came from three reservoirs, the Wombridge Pool, the Middle Pool, and the Trench Pool.

The iron works was connected by rail to the Stafford line via the Coalport Branch Line, originally via a Wombridge Branch from the sidings at Trench, but in the 1870s shortened to direct access from the Coalport Branch. Also in the 1870s the iron works went from producing pig iron to making wrought iron, and gained a forge, ten puddling furnaces, and three rolling mills. In 1912 a set of railway sidings for the Wombridge Ballast Tip, which the Wombridge Pool had been converted into by that time, was added; which moved around as the tip filled and eventually were removed sometime between 1937 and 1940, which local railway historian David Clarke believes is when the tip became full.

Prior to the Iron Works, in the 17th century there had been water-powered iron smelting of iron ore from the colliery.

=== Colliery ===
Records of coal mining in Wombridge go back at least as far as the 16th century, with a farm belonging to the coal mine that was run by the Wombridge Priory being recorded as paying an annual rent for 1536–1537 of £5 (equivalent to £3,570 in 2025). William Reynolds is recorded as recommencing open cast mining for coal and iron-stone around 1793; and a "without a beam" variant of the Newcomen steam engine is recorded as being erected in 1794.

The coal field, named Colebrook Dale Coal-Field, ranged from Wombridge to Coalport some 16 miles (26 km) south, and was 2 miles (3.2 km) wide at its broadest. The coal seams worked were known in local miner's jargon as the "Chance", "Clunch", "Flint", "Little Flint", "Foot", "Fungus", "Randle", "Top", "Two-foot", and "Three-quarter" seams; several variously extending to Oakengates, Donnington, Dawley, Malin's Lee, Madeley, and Amies (near Broseley).

In 1895 the colliery was registered under the Coal Mines Regulation Act as owned by Hopely Brothers of Wombridge, with pits at the Rose and Crown, the Round House, and the Water Engine. A miner named William Knight died there from suffocation by natural gas in an old shaft that was in the process of being closed, on 1 July 1896.

The Wombridge Canal, built in 1788 a portion of which fell into disuse around 1819 and the rest of which was amalgamated into the Shrewsbury Canal, connected the mines to the furnaces and canal at Donnington Wood.

=== Demographics ===
Wombridge had a population of 1,855 in 1835, 2,057 in 1841, 2,365 in 1851, and 2,601 in 1861.

The 1831 census broke this down into 478 males 20-years-old or greater, 5 agricultural occupiers with employees, 9 agricultural occupiers without, 11 agricultural labourers, 92 employed in retail/trade/handicraft, 361 in non-agricultural labour, and 2 female servants.

There were 360 houses in the parish as of 1851.

== Wombridge today ==
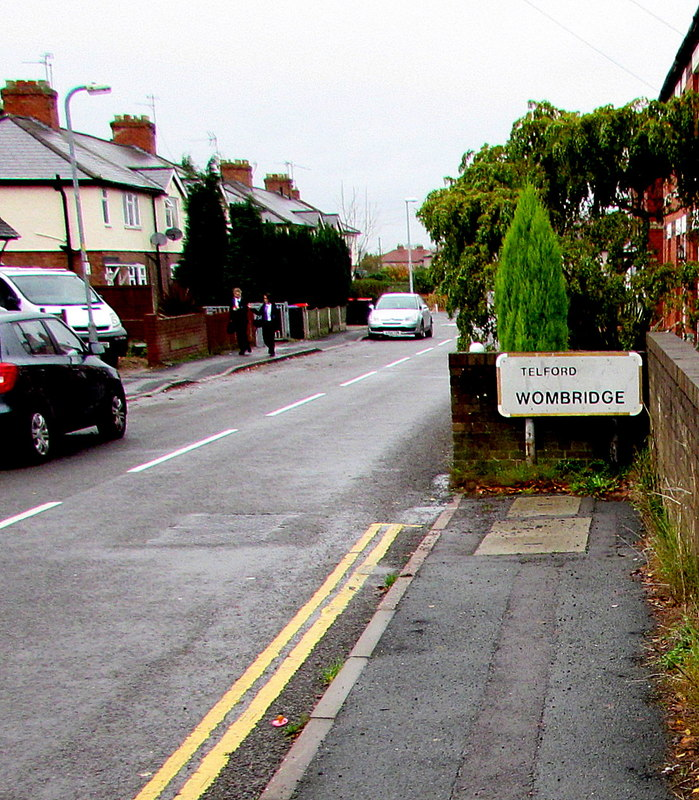
A road sign identifying Wombridge, seen in 2015

Wombridge is an area in the Borough of Telford and Wrekin, north west of Telford town centre, near the A442 road, and between Hadley and Oakengates. The Church of St Mary and St Leonard is an active church within the East Telford Benefice, and the area is served by Wombridge Primary School, although the school's postal address is "Oakengates, Telford" rather than "Wombridge".

== See also ==
- Stafford–Shrewsbury line
