= Lilleshall Company =

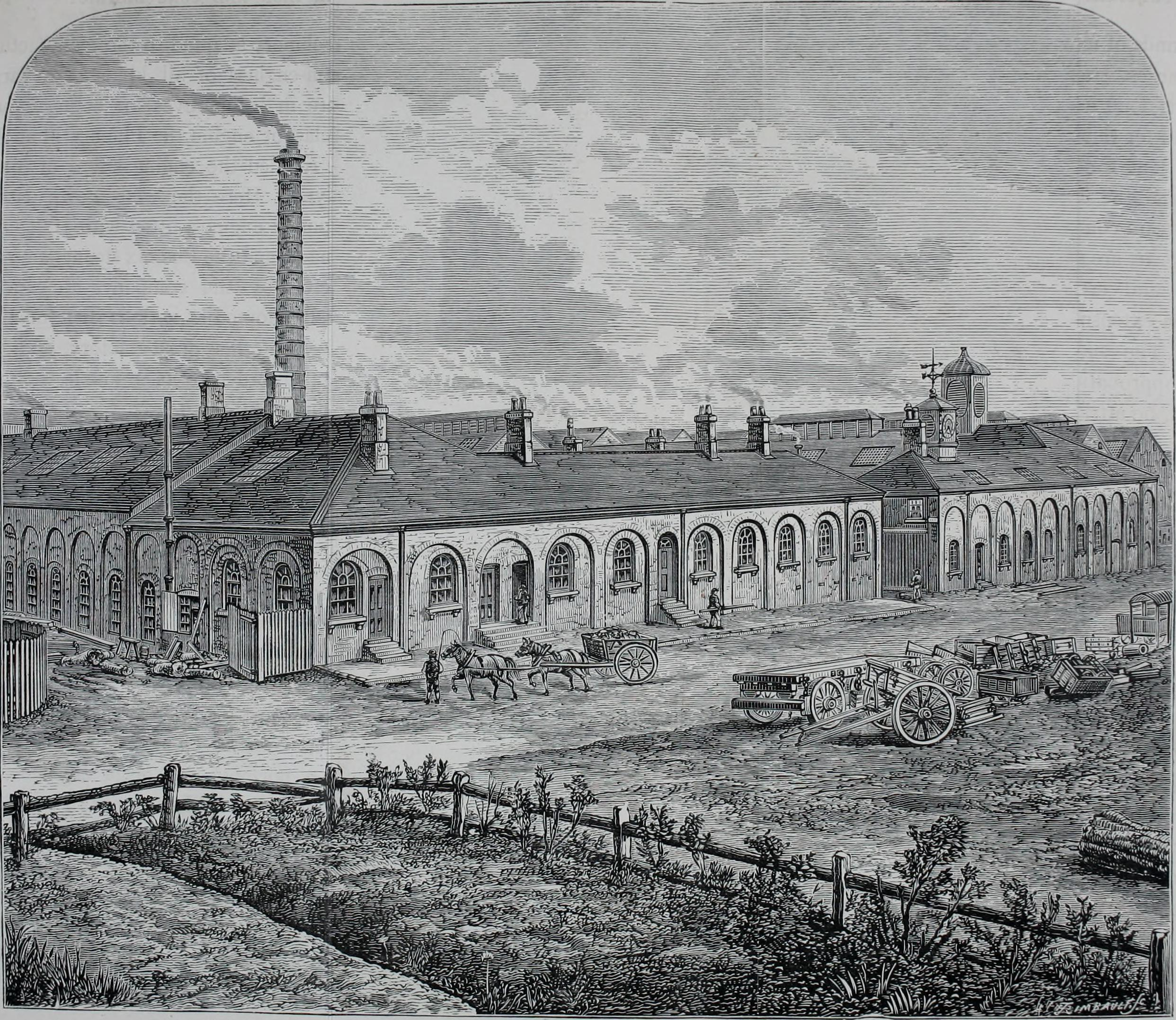

The Lilleshall Company was a large engineering company in Oakengates, Shropshire, England founded in 1802. Its operations included mechanical engineering, coal mining, iron and steel making and brickworks. The company was noted for its winding, pumping and blast engines, and operated a private railway network. It also constructed railway locomotives from 1862 to 1888.

== History ==
The company's origins date back to 1764 when Earl Gower formed a company to construct the Donnington Wood Canal on his estate. In 1802 the Lilleshall Company was founded by the Marquess of Stafford in partnership with four local capitalists.

In 1862 the company exhibited a 2-2-2 express passenger locomotive at the 1862 International Exhibition in London.

In 1880 it became a Public company. In 1951 the Lilleshall Iron and Steel Co was nationalised under the Iron and Steel Act but then sold back to Lilleshall Co. under the provisions of the Iron and Steel Act 1953.

Lilleshall Company Railways closed in 1959.

In 1961 they were described as 'structural and mechanical engineers, manufacturers of rolled steel products, glazed bricks, sanitaryware, Spectra-Glaze and concrete products', with 750 employees.

The company began to decline during the 1960s. Many of its artefacts and archives are preserved by the Ironbridge Gorge Museum Trust.
