= History of the steel industry (1850–1970) =

Before 1800 A.D., the iron and steel industry was located where raw material, power supply and running water were easily available. After 1950, the iron and steel industry began to be located on large areas of flat land near sea ports. The history of the modern steel industry began in the late 1850s. Since then, steel has become a staple of the world's industrial economy. This article is intended only to address the business, economic and social dimensions of the industry, since the bulk production of steel began as a result of Henry Bessemer's development of the Bessemer converter, in 1857. Previously, steel was very expensive to produce, and was only used in small, expensive items, such as knives, swords and armor.

== Technology ==
Steel is an alloy composed of between 0.2 and 2.0 percent carbon, with the balance being iron. From prehistory through the creation of the blast furnace, iron was produced from iron ore as wrought iron, 99.82–100 percent Fe, and the process of making steel involved adding carbon to iron, usually in a serendipitous manner, in the forge, or via the cementation process. The introduction of the blast furnace reversed the problem. A blast furnace produces pig iron — an alloy of approximately 90 percent iron and 10 percent carbon. When the process of steel-making is started with pig iron, instead of wrought iron, the challenge is to remove a sufficient amount of carbon to reduce it to the 0.2 to 2 percentage for steel.

Before about 1860, steel was an expensive product, made in small quantities and used mostly for swords, tools and cutlery; all large metal structures were made of wrought or cast iron. Steelmaking was centered in Sheffield and Middlesbrough, Britain, which supplied the European and American markets. The introduction of cheap steel was due to the Bessemer and the open hearth processes, two technological advances made in England. In the Bessemer process, molten pig iron is converted to steel by blowing air through it after it was removed from the furnace. The air blast burned the carbon and silicon out of the pig iron, releasing heat and causing the temperature of the molten metal to rise. Henry Bessemer demonstrated the process in 1856 and had a successful operation going by 1864. By 1870 Bessemer steel was widely used for ship plate. By the 1850s, the speed, weight, and quantity of railway traffic was limited by the strength of the wrought iron rails in use. The solution was to turn to steel rails, which the Bessemer process made competitive in price. Experience quickly proved steel had much greater strength and durability and could handle the increasingly heavy and faster engines and cars.

After 1890 the Bessemer process was gradually supplanted by open-hearth steelmaking and by the middle of the 20th century was no longer in use. The open-hearth process originated in the 1860s in Germany and France. The usual open-hearth process used pig iron, ore, and scrap, and became known as the Siemens-Martin process. Its process allowed closer control over the composition of the steel; also, a substantial quantity of scrap could be included in the charge. The crucible process remained important for making high-quality alloy steel into the 20th century. By 1900 the electric arc furnace was adapted to steelmaking and by the 1920s, the falling cost of electricity allowed it to largely supplant the crucible process for specialty steels.

== Britain ==
=== 19th century ===
Britain led the world's Industrial Revolution with its early commitment to coal mining, steam power, textile mills, machinery, railways, and shipbuilding. Britain's demand for iron and steel, combined with ample capital and energetic entrepreneurs, made it the world leader in the first half of the 19th century. Steel has a vital role during the industrial revolution.

In 1875, Britain accounted for 47% of world production of pig iron, a third of which came from the Middlesbrough area and almost 40% of steel. 40% of British output was exported to the U.S., which was rapidly building its rail and industrial infrastructure. Two decades later in 1896, however, the British share of world production had plunged to 29% for pig iron and 22.5% for steel, and little was sent to the U.S. The U.S. was now the world leader and Germany was catching up to Britain. Britain had lost its American market, and was losing its role elsewhere; indeed American products were now underselling British steel in Britain.

The growth of pig iron output was dramatic. Britain went from 1.3 million tons in 1840 to 6.7 million in 1870 and 10.4 in 1913. The US started from a lower base, but grew faster; from 0.3 million tons in 1840, to 1.7 million in 1870, and 31.5 million in 1913. Germany went from 0.2 million tons in 1859 to 1.6 in 1871 and 19.3 in 1913. France, Belgium, Austria-Hungary, and Russia, combined, went from 2.2 million tons in 1870 to 14.1 million tons in 1913, on the eve of the First World War. During the war the demand for artillery shells and other supplies caused a spurt in output and a diversion to military uses.

=== 20th century ===
Abé (1996) explores the record of iron and steel firms in Victorian England by analyzing Bolckow Vaughan & Company. It was wedded for too long to obsolescent technology and was a very late adopter of the open hearth furnace method. Abé concludes that the firm—and the British steel industry—suffered from a failure of entrepreneurship and planning.

Blair (1997) explores the history of the British Steel industry since the Second World War to evaluate the impact of government intervention in a market economy. Entrepreneurship was lacking in the 1940s; the government could not persuade the industry to upgrade its plants. For generations the industry had followed a patchwork growth pattern which proved inefficient in the face of world competition. In 1946 the first steel development plan was put into practice with the aim of increasing capacity; the Iron and Steel Act 1949 meant nationalization of the industry in the form of the Iron and Steel Corporation of Great Britain. However, the reforms were dismantled by the Conservative Party governments in the 1950s. In 1967, under Labour Party control again, the industry was again nationalized. But by then twenty years of political manipulation had left companies such as the British Steel Corporation with serious problems: a complacency with existing equipment, plants operating under capacity (low efficiency), poor quality assets, outdated technology, government price controls, higher coal and oil costs, lack of funds for capital improvement, and increasing world market competition. By the 1970s the Labour government had its main goal to keep employment high in the declining industry. Since British Steel was a main employer in depressed regions, it had kept many mills and facilities that were operating at a loss. In the 1980s, Conservative Prime Minister Margaret Thatcher re-privatized BSC as British Steel plc.

== Australia ==
There were various iron-making ventures during the 19th century, and steel was made but only on a very small scale.

The first commercial scale production of steel in Australia was by William Sandford Limited at the Eskbank Ironworks at Lithgow, New South Wales, in 1901. The plant became Australia's first integrated iron and steel works in 1907. It was later expanded by Charles Hoskins. The first steel rails rolled in Australia were rolled there in 1911. Between 1928 and 1932, the operations at Lithgow were transferred, under the management of Cecil Hoskins, to a new plant at Port Kembla, still the site of most of Australia's steel production today.

The Minister for Public Works, Arthur Hill Griffith, had consistently advocated for the greater industrialization of Newcastle, then, under William Holman, personally negotiated the establishment of a steelworks with G. D. Delprat of BHP. Griffith was also the architect of the Walsh Island establishment.

In 1915, BHP ventured into steel manufacturing with its Newcastle Steelworks, which was closed in 1999. The 'long products' side of the steel business was spun off to form OneSteel in 2000. BHP's decision to move from mining ore to open a steelworks at Newcastle was precipitated by the technical limitations in recovering value from mining the 'lower-lying sulphide ores'. The discovery of Iron Knob and Iron Monarch near the western shore of the Spencer Gulf in South Australia combined with the development by the BHP metallurgist, Archibald Drummond Carmichael, of a technique for 'separating zinc sulphides from the accompanying earth and rock' led BHP 'to implement the startlingly simple and cheap process for liberating vast amounts of valuable metals out of sulphide ores, including huge heaps of tailings and slimes up to' 40 ft (12 m) high.

== Germany ==
The Ruhr Valley provided an excellent location for the German iron and steel industry because of the availability of raw materials, coal, transport, a skilled labor force, nearby markets, and an entrepreneurial spirit that led to the creation of many firms, often in close conjunction with coal mines. By 1850 the Ruhr had 50 iron works with 2,813 full-time employees. The first modern furnace was built in 1849. The unification of Germany in 1871 gave further impetus to rapid growth, as the German Empire started to catch up with Britain. From 1880 to World War I, the industry of the Ruhr area consisted of numerous enterprises, each working on a separate level of production. Mixed enterprises could unite all levels of production through vertical integration, thus lowering production costs. Technological progress brought new advantages as well. These developments set the stage for the creation of combined business concerns.

The leading firm was Friedrich Krupp AG run by the Krupp family. Many diverse, large-scale family firms such as Krupp's reorganized in order to adapt to the changing conditions and meet the economic depression of the 1870s, which reduced the earnings in the German iron and steel industry. Krupp reformed his accounting system to better manage his growing empire, adding a specialized bureau of calculation as well as a bureau for the control of times and wages. The rival firm GHH quickly followed, as did Thyssen AG, which had been founded by August Thyssen in 1867. Germany became Europe's leading steel-producing nation in the late 19th century, thanks in large part to the protection from American and British competition afforded by tariffs and cartels.

By 1913 American and German exports dominated the world steel market, and Britain slipped to third place. German steel production grew explosively from 1 million metric tons in 1885 to 10 million in 1905 and peaked at 19 million in 1918. In the 1920s Germany produced about 15 million tons, but output plunged to 6 million in 1933. Under Nazi rule, steel output peaked at 22 million tons in 1940, then dipped to 18 million in 1944 under Allied bombing. The merger of four major firms into the German Steel Trust (Vereinigte Stahlwerke) in 1926 was modeled on the U.S. Steel corporation in the U.S. The goal was to move beyond the limitations of the old cartel system by incorporating advances simultaneously inside a single corporation. The new company emphasized rationalization of management structures and modernization of the technology; it employed a multi-divisional structure and used return on investment as its measure of success. It represented the modernization of the German steel industry because its internal structure, management methods, use of technology, and emphasis on mass production. The chief difference was that consumer capitalism as an industrial strategy did not seem plausible to German steel industrialists.

In iron and steel and other industries, German firms avoided cut-throat competition and instead relied on trade associations. Germany was a world leader because of its prevailing "corporatist mentality", its strong bureaucratic tradition, and the encouragement of the government. These associations regulated competition and allowed small firms to function in the shadow of much larger companies.

With the need to rebuild the bombed-out infrastructure after the Second World War, Marshall Plan (1948–51) enabled West Germany to rebuild and modernize its mills. It produced 3 million tons of steel in 1947, 12 million in 1950, 34 million in 1960 and 46 million in 1970. East Germany produced about a tenth as much.

== France ==
The French iron industry lagged behind Britain and Belgium in the early 19th century. After 1850 it also lagged behind Germany and Luxembourg. Its industry comprised too many small, inefficient firms. 20th century growth was not robust, due more to traditional, social and economic attitudes than to inherent geographic, population, or resource factors. Despite a high national income level, the French steel industry remained laggard. The industry was based on large supplies of coal and iron ore, and was dispersed across the country. The greatest output came in 1929, at 10.4 million metric tons. The industry suffered sharply during the Great Depression and World War II. Prosperity returned by mid-1950s, but profits came largely from strong domestic demand rather than competitive capacity. Late modernization delayed the development of powerful unions and collective bargaining.

== Italy ==
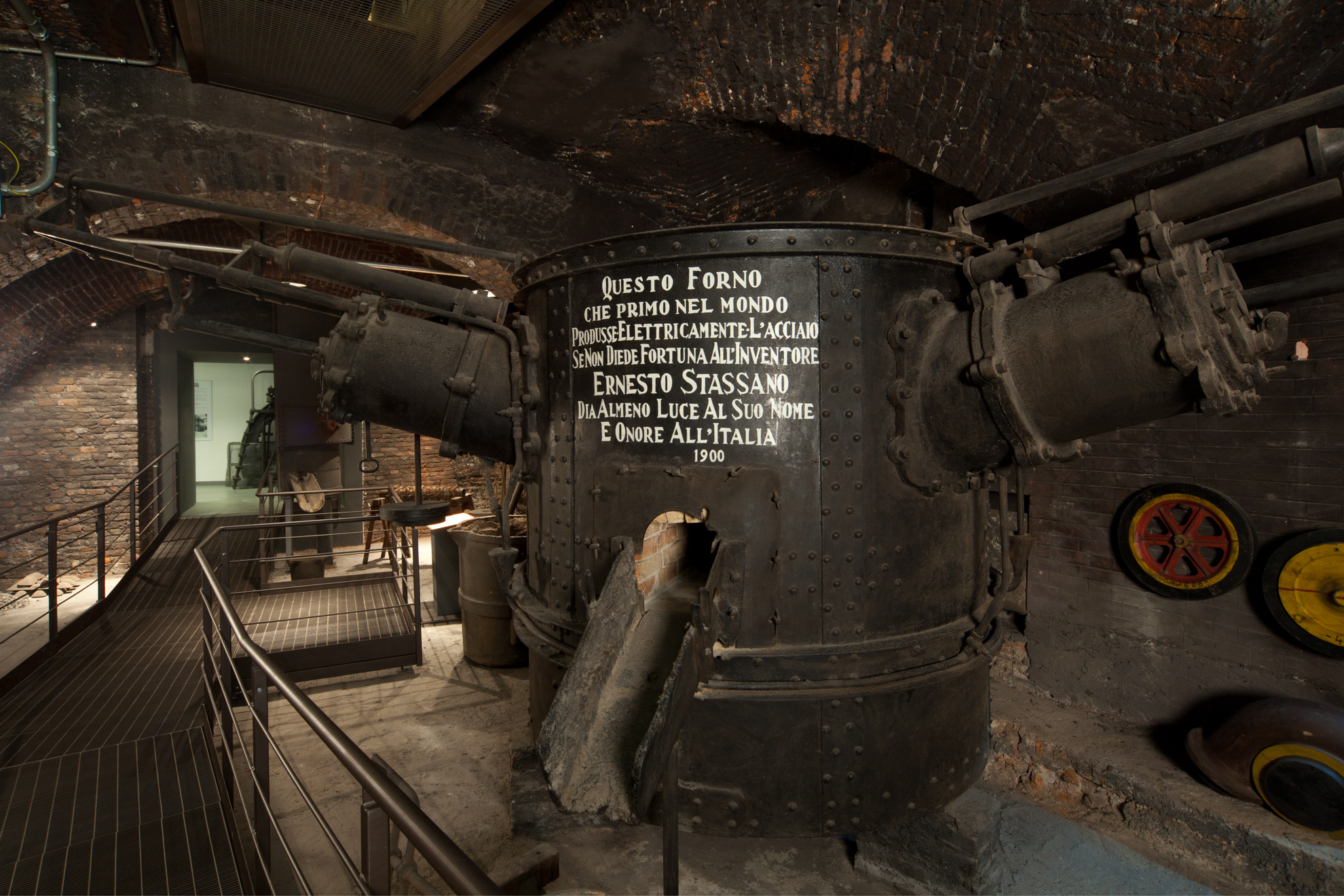
Stassano furnace exhibited at the Museo della Scienza e della Tecnologia "Leonardo da Vinci", Milan

In Italy a shortage of coal led the steel industry to specialize in the use of hydro-electrical energy, exploiting ideas pioneered by Ernesto Stassano from 1898 (Stassano furnace). Despite periods of innovation (1907–14), growth (1915–18), and consolidation (1918–22), early expectations were only partly realized. Steel output in the 1920s and 1930s averaged about 2.1 million metric tons. Per capita consumption was much lower than the average of Western Europe. Electrical processes were an important substitute, yet did not improve competitiveness or reduce prices. Instead, they reinforced the dualism of the sector and initiated a vicious circle that prevented market expansion. Italy modernized its industry in the 1950s and 1960s and it grew rapidly, becoming second only to West Germany in the 1970s. Strong labour unions kept employment levels high. Troubles multiplied after 1980, however, as foreign competition became stiffer. In 1980 the largest producer Nuova Italsider [now dubbed Ilva (company) lost 746 billion lira in its inefficient operations. In the 1990s the Italian steel industry, then mostly state-owned, was largely privatised. Today the country is the world's seventh-largest steel exporter.

== United States ==
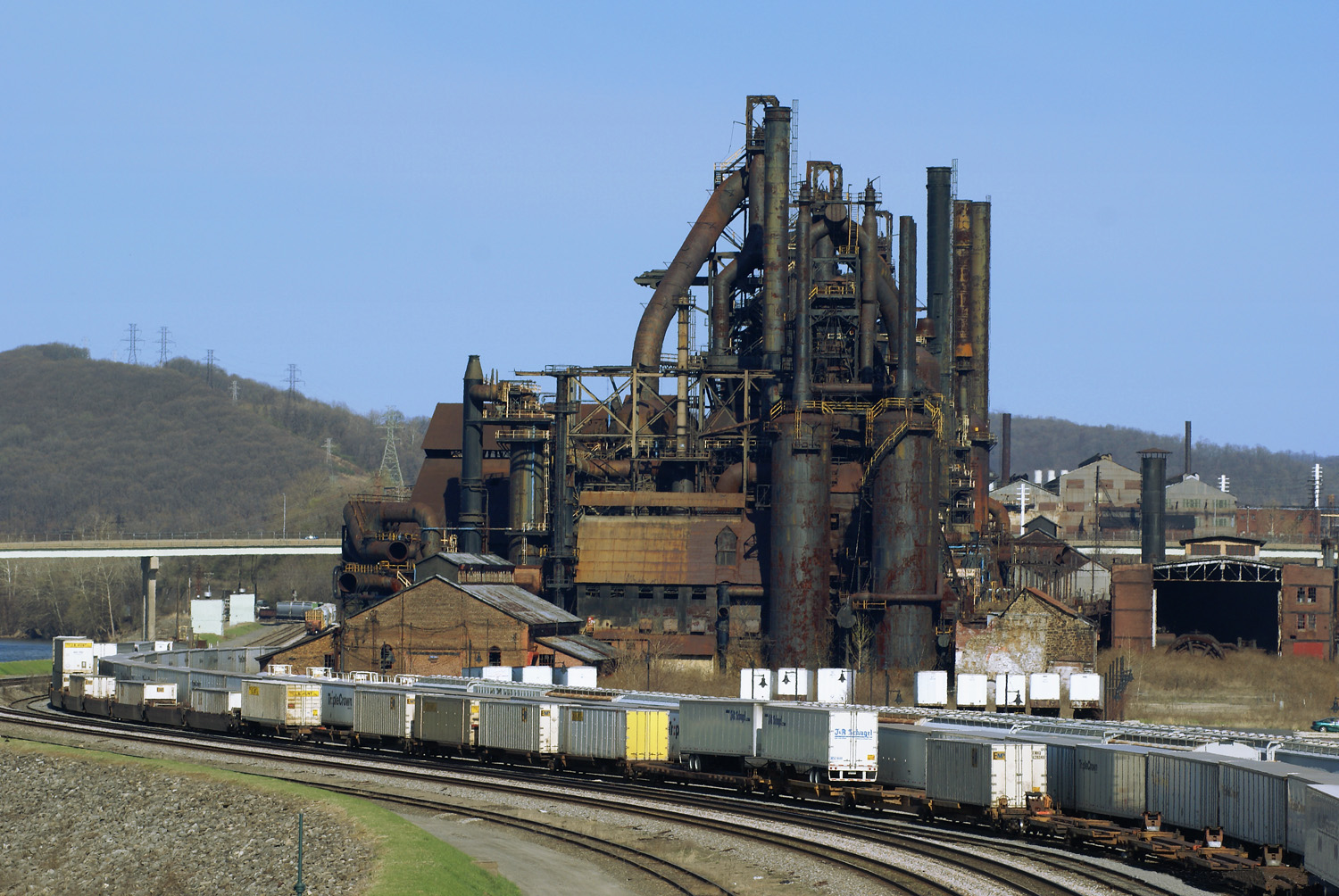
Bethlehem Steel in Bethlehem, Pennsylvania was the second largest American steel manufacturer before its late 20th century descent. The company announced in 1982 that it was discontinuing most of its operations, declared bankruptcy in 2001, and was dissolved in 2003.

From 1875 to 1920 American steel production grew from 380,000 tons to 60 million tons annually, making the U.S. the world leader. The annual growth rates in steel 1870–1913 were 7.0% for the US; 1.0% for Britain; 6.0% for Germany; and 4.3% for France, Belgium, and Russia, the other major producers. This explosive American growth rested on solid technological foundations and the continuous rapid expansion of urban infrastructures, office buildings, factories, railroads, bridges and other sectors that increasingly demanded steel. The use of steel in automobiles and household appliances came in the 20th century.

Some key elements in the growth of steel production included the easy availability of iron ore, and coal. Iron ore of fair quality was abundant in the eastern states, but the Lake Superior region contained massive deposits of exceedingly rich ore; the Marquette Iron Range was discovered in 1844; operations began in 1846. Other ranges were opened by 1910, including the Menominee, Gogebic, Vermilion, Cuyuna, and, greatest of all, (in 1892) the Mesabi range in Minnesota. This iron ore was shipped through the Great Lakes to ports such as Chicago, Detroit, Cleveland, Erie and Buffalo for shipment by rail to the steel mills. Abundant coal was available in Pennsylvania, West Virginia, and Ohio. Manpower was short. Few native-born Americans in the United States wanted to work in the mills, but immigrants from Britain and Germany (and later from Eastern Europe) arrived in great numbers.

In 1869 iron was already a major industry, accounting for 6.6% of manufacturing employment and 7.8% of manufacturing output. By then the central figure was Andrew Carnegie, who made Pittsburgh the center of the industry. He sold his operations to US Steel in 1901, which became the world's largest steel corporation for decades.

In the 1880s, the transition from wrought iron puddling to mass-produced Bessemer steel greatly increased worker productivity. Highly skilled workers remained essential, but the average level of skill declined. Nevertheless, steelworkers earned much more than ironworkers despite their fewer skills. Workers in an integrated, synchronized mass production environment wielded greater strategic power, for the greater cost of mistakes bolstered workers' status. The experience demonstrated that the new technology did not decrease worker bargaining leverage by creating an interchangeable, unskilled workforce.

=== Alabama ===
In Alabama, industrialization was generating a ravenous appetite for the state's coal and iron ore. Production was booming, and unions were attempting to organize unincarcerated miners. Convicts provided an ideal captive work force: cheap, usually docile, unable to organize and available when unincarcerated laborers went on strike." The Southern agrarian economy did not accommodate convict leasing as well as the industrial economy did, whose jobs were often unappealing or dangerous, offering hard-labor and low pay. The competition, expansion, and growth of mining and steel companies also created a high demand for labor, but union labor posed a threat to expanding companies. As unions bargained for higher wages and better conditions, often organizing strikes in order to achieve their goals, the growing companies would be forced to agree to union demands or face abrupt halts in production. The rate companies paid for convict leases, which paid the laborer nothing, was regulated by government and state officials who entered the labor contracts with companies. "The companies built their own prisons, fed and clothed the convicts, and supplied guards as they saw fit." (Blackmon 2001) Alabama's use of convict leasing was commanding; 51 of its 67 counties regularly leased convicts serving for misdemeanors at a rate of about $5–20 per month, equal to about $160–500 in 2015. Although the influence of labor unions forced some states to move away from the profitable convict lease agreements and run traditional prisons, plenty of companies began substituting convict labor in their operations in the twentieth century. "The biggest user of forced labor in Alabama at the turn of the century was Tennessee Coal, Iron & Railroad Co., [of] U.S. Steel"

=== Carnegie ===
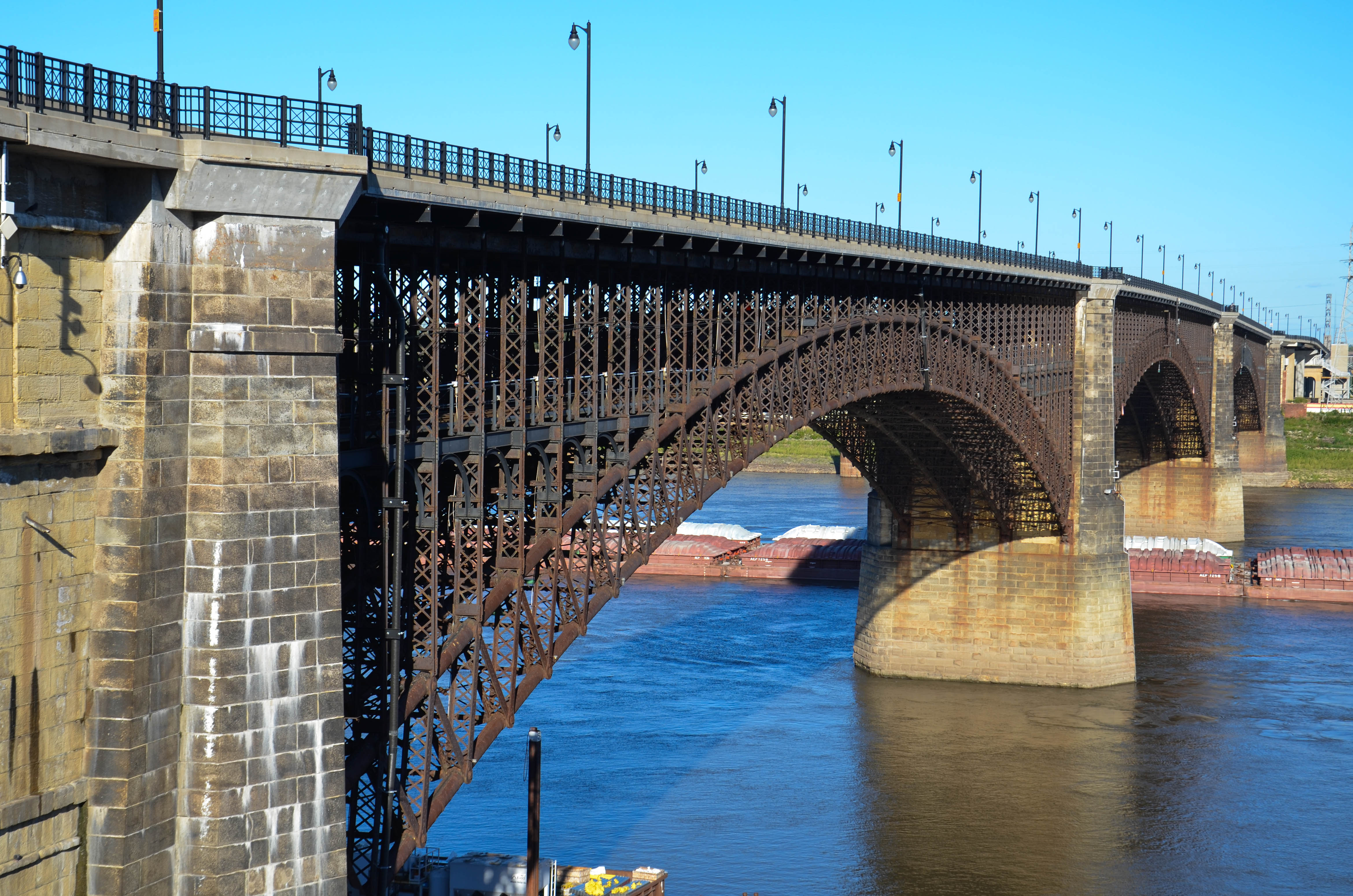
Eads Bridge across the Mississippi River, opened in 1874 using Carnegie steel

Andrew Carnegie, a Scottish immigrant, advanced the cheap and efficient mass production of steel rails for railroad lines, by adopting the Bessemer process. After an early career in railroads, Carnegie foresaw the potential for steel to amass vast profits. He asked his cousin, George Lauder to join him in America from Scotland. Lauder was a leading mechanical engineer who had studied under Lord Kelvin. Lauder devised several new systems for the Carnegie Steel Company including the process for washing and coking dross from coal mines, which resulted in a significant increase in scale, profits, and enterprise value.

Carnegie's first mill was the Edgar Thomson Works in Braddock, PA, just outside of Pittsburgh. In 1888, he bought the rival Homestead Steel Works, which included an extensive plant served by tributary coal and iron fields, a 425-mile (685 km) long railway, and a line of lake steamships. He would also add the Duquesne Works to his empire. These three mills on the Monongahela River would make Pittsburgh the steel capital of the world. In the late 1880s, the Carnegie Steel Company was the largest manufacturer of pig iron, steel rails, and coke in the world, with a capacity to produce approximately 2,000 tons of pig iron per day. A consolidation of Carnegie's assets and those of his associates occurred in 1892 with the launching of the Carnegie Steel Company.

Lauder would go on to lead the development of the use of steel in armor and armaments for the Carnegie Steel Company, spending significant time at the Krupp factory in Germany in 1886 before returning to build the massive armor plate mill at the Homestead Steel Works that would revolutionize naval warfare.

By 1889, the U.S. output of steel exceeded that of Britain, and Andrew Carnegie owned a large part of it. By 1900, the profits of Carnegie Bros. & Company alone stood at $480,000,000 with $225,000,000 being Carnegie's share.

Carnegie, through Keystone, supplied the steel for and owned shares in the landmark Eads Bridge project across the Mississippi River in St. Louis, Missouri (completed 1874). This project was an important proof-of-concept for steel technology which marked the opening of a new steel market.

The Homestead Strike was a violent labor dispute in 1892 that involved an attack by strikers against private security guards. The governor called in the National Guard. The strike failed and the union collapsed. The dispute took place at Carnegie's Homestead Steel Works between the Amalgamated Association of Iron and Steel Workers and the Carnegie Steel Company. The final result was a major defeat for the union and a setback for efforts to unionize steelworkers.

Carnegie sold all his steel holdings in 1901; they were merged into U.S. Steel and it was non-union until the late 1930s.

=== US Steel ===
By 1900 the US was the largest producer and also the lowest cost producer, and demand for steel seemed inexhaustible. Output had tripled since 1890, but customers, not producers, mostly benefitted. Productivity-enhancing technology encouraged faster and faster rates of investment in new plants. However, during recessions, demand fell sharply taking down output, prices, and profits. Charles M. Schwab of Carnegie Steel proposed a solution: consolidation. Financier J. P. Morgan arranged the buyout of Carnegie and most other major firms, and put Elbert Gary in charge. The massive Gary Works steel mill on Lake Michigan was for many years the largest steel producing facility in the world.

US Steel combined finishing firms (American Tin Plate (controlled by William Henry "Judge" Moore), American Steel and Wire, and National Tube) with two major integrated companies, Carnegie Steel and Federal Steel. It was capitalized at $1.466 billion, and included 213 manufacturing mills, one thousand miles of railroad, and 41 mines. In 1901, it accounted for 66% of America's steel output, and almost 30% of the world's. During World War I, its annual production exceeded the combined output of all German and Austrian firms.

The Steel Strike of 1919 disrupted the entire industry for months, but the union lost and its membership sharply declined. Rapid growth of cities made the 1920s boom years. President Harding and social reformers forced it to end the 12-hour day in 1923.

Earnings were recorded at $2.650 billion for 2016.

=== Bethlehem Steel ===
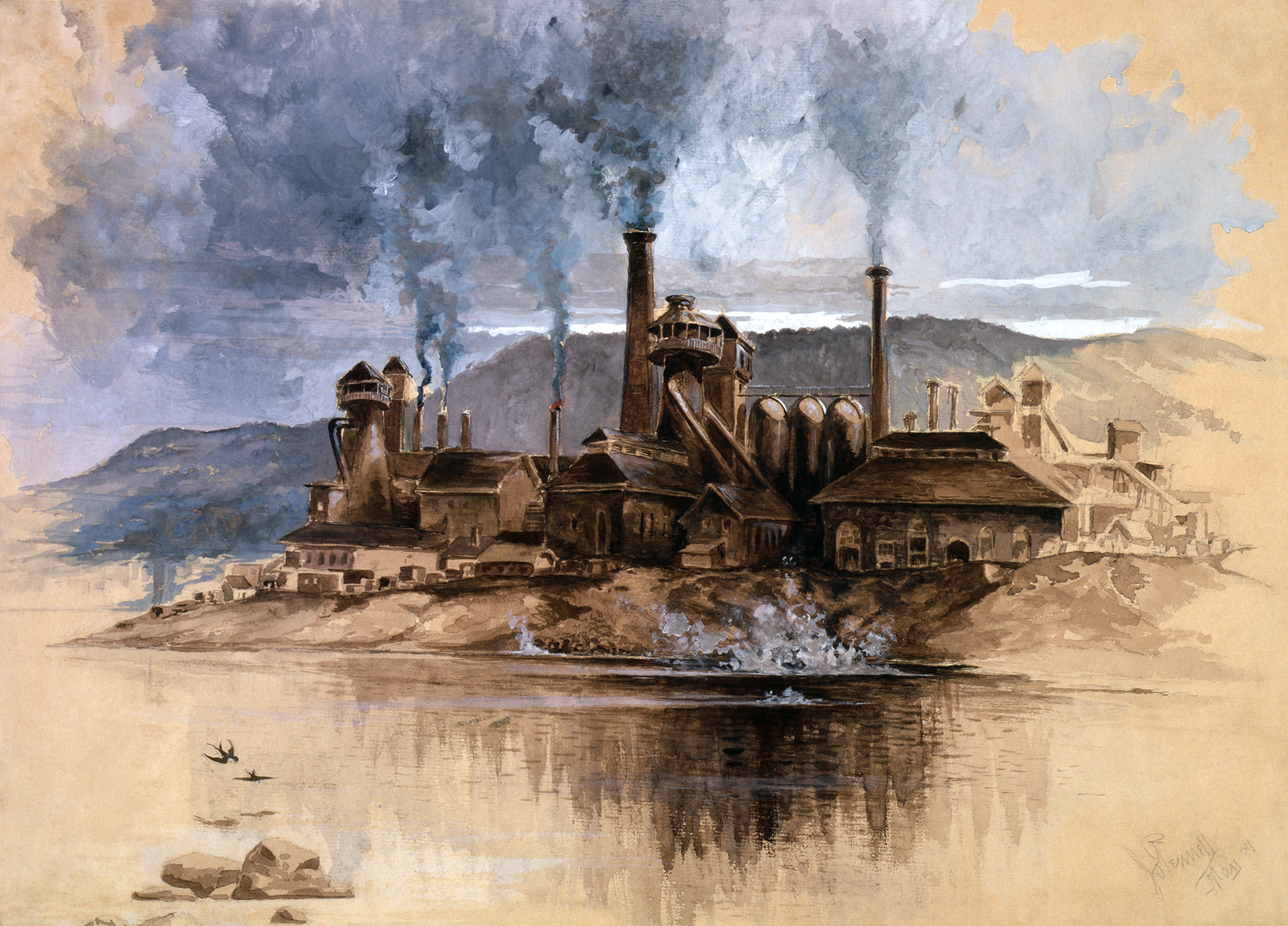
Bethlehem steel works in Bethlehem, Pennsylvania, 1881

Charles M. Schwab (1862–1939) and Eugene Grace (1876–1960) made Bethlehem Steel the second-largest American steel company by the 1920s. Schwab had been the operating head of Carnegie Steel and US Steel. In 1903 he purchased the small firm Bethlehem Steel, and in 1916 made Grace president. Innovation was the keynote at a time when U.S. Steel under Judge Elbert Henry Gary moved slowly. Bethlehem concentrated on government contracts, such as ships and naval armor, and on construction beams, especially for skyscrapers and bridges. Its subsidiary Bethlehem Shipbuilding Corporation operated 15 shipyards in World War II. It produced 1,121 ships, more than any other builder during the war and nearly one-fifth of the U.S. Navy's fleet. Its peak employment was 180,000 workers, out of a company-wide wartime peak of 300,000. After 1945 Bethlehem doubled its steel capacity, a measure of the widespread optimism in the industry. However the company ignored the new technologies then being developed in Europe and Japan. Seeking labor peace in order to avoid strikes, Bethlehem like the other majors agreed to large wage and benefits increases that kept its costs high. After Grace retired the executives concentrated on short term profits and postponed innovations that led to long-term inefficiency. It went bankrupt in 2001.

=== Republic Steel ===
Cyrus Eaton (1883–1979) in 1925 purchased the small Trumbull Steel Company of Warren, Ohio, for $18 million. In the late 1920s he purchased undervalued steel and rubber companies. In 1930, Eaton consolidated his steel holdings into the Republic Steel, based in Cleveland; it became the third-largest steel producer in the U.S., after US Steel and Bethlehem Steel.

=== Unions ===
The American Federation of Labor (AFL) tried and failed to organize the steelworkers in 1919. Although the strike gained widespread middle-class support because of its demand and the 12-hour day, the strike failed and unionization was postponed until the late 1930s. The mills ended the 12-hour day in the early 1920s.

The second surge of unionization came under the auspices of the militant Congress of Industrial Organizations in the late 1930s, when it set up the Steel Workers Organizing Committee. The SWOC focused almost exclusively on the achievement of a signed contract, with "Little Steel" (the major producers except for US Steel). At the grassroots however, women of the steel auxiliaries, workers on the picket line, and middle-class liberals from across Chicago sought to transform the strike into something larger than a showdown over union recognition. In Chicago, the Little Steel strike raised the possibility that steelworkers might embrace the ‘civic unionism’ that animated the left-led unions of the era. The effort failed, and while the strike was won, the resulting powerful United Steelworkers of America union suppressed grassroots opinions.

=== Apogee and decline ===
Integration was the watchword as the various processes were brought together by large corporations, from mining the iron ore to shipping the finished product to wholesalers. The typical steelworks was a giant operation, including blast furnaces, Bessemer converters, open-hearth furnaces, rolling mills, coke ovens and foundries, as well as supported transportation facilities. The largest ones were operated in the region from Chicago to St. Louis to Baltimore, Philadelphia and Buffalo. Smaller operations appeared in Birmingham, Alabama, and in California.

The industry grew slowly but other industries grew even faster, so that by 1967, as the downward spiral began, steel accounted for 4.4% of manufacturing employment and 4.9% of manufacturing output. After 1970 American steel producers could no longer compete effectively with low-wage producers elsewhere. Imports and local mini-mills undercut sales.

Per-capita steel consumption in the U.S. peaked in 1977, then fell by half before staging a modest recovery to levels well below the peak.

Most mills were closed. Bethlehem went bankrupt in 2001. In 1984, Republic merged with Jones and Laughlin Steel Company; the new firm went bankrupt in 2001. US Steel diversified into oil (Marathon Oil was spun off in 2001). Finally US Steel reemerged in 2002 with plants in three American locations (plus one in Europe) that employed fewer than one-tenth the 168,000 workers of 1902. By 2001 steel accounted for only 0.8% of manufacturing employment and 0.8% of manufacturing output.

The world steel industry peaked in 2007. That year, ThyssenKrupp spent $12 billion to build the two most modern mills in the world, in Alabama and Brazil. The worldwide great recession starting in 2008, however, with its heavy cutbacks in construction, sharply lowered demand and prices fell 40%. ThyssenKrupp lost $11 billion on its two new plants, which sold steel below the cost of production. Finally in 2013, ThyssenKrupp offered the plants for sale at under $4 billion.

=== Legacy ===
The President of the United States is authorized to declare each May "Steelmark Month" to recognize the contribution made by the steel industry to the United States.

== Asia ==
=== Japan ===
Yonekura shows the steel industry was central to the economic development of Japan. The nation's sudden transformation from feudal to modern society in the late nineteenth century, its heavy industrialization and imperialist war ventures in 1900–1945, and the post-World War II high-economic growth, all depended on iron and steel. The other great Japanese industries, such as shipbuilding, automobiles, and industrial machinery are closely linked to steel. From 1850 to 1970, the industry increased its crude steel production from virtually nothing to 93.3 million tons (the third largest in the world).

The government's activist Ministry of International Trade and Industry (MITI) played a major role in coordination. The transfer of technology from the West and the establishment of competitive firms involved far more than buying foreign hardware. MITI located steel mills and organized a domestic market; it sponsored Yawata Steel Company. Japanese engineers and entrepreneurs internally developed the necessary technological and organizational capabilities, planned the transfer and adoption of technology, and gauged demand and sources of raw materials and finances.

=== India ===
The Bengal Iron Works was founded at Kulti, Bengal, in 1870 which began its production in 1874 followed by The Tata Iron and Steel Company (TISCO) was established by Dorabji Tata in 1907, as part of his father's conglomerate. By 1939 it operated the largest steel plant in the British Empire. The company launched a major modernization and expansion program in 1951.

Prime Minister Jawaharlal Nehru, a believer in socialism, decided that the technological revolution in India needed maximization of steel production. He, therefore, formed a government owned company, Hindustan Steel Limited (HSL) and set up three steel plants in the 1950s.

The Indian steel industry began expanding into Europe in the 21st century. In January 2007 India's Tata Steel made a successful $11.3 billion offer to buy European steel maker Corus Group. In 2006, Mittal Steel Company (based in London but with Indian management) merged with Arcelor after a takeover bid for $34.3 billion to become ArcelorMittal (based in Luxembourg City), with 10% of the world's output.

=== China ===
Communist party Chairman Mao Zedong disdained the cities and put his faith in the Chinese peasantry for a Great Leap Forward. Mao saw steel production as the key to overnight economic modernization, promising that within 15 years China's steel production would surpass that of Britain. In 1958 he decided that steel production would double within the year, using backyard steel furnaces run by inexperienced peasants. The plan was a fiasco, as the small amounts of steel produced were of very poor quality, and the diversion of resources out of agriculture produced a massive famine in 1959–61 that killed millions.

With reform and opening up brought in by Deng Xiaoping, who led China from 1978 to 1992, China began to develop a modern steel industry by building new steel plants and recycling scrap metal from the United States and Europe. As of 2013 China produced 779 million metric tons of steel each year, making it by far the largest steel producing country in the world. This is compared to 165 for the European Union, 110 for Japan, 87 for the United States and 81 for India. China's 2013 steel production was equivalent to an average of 3.14 cubic meters of steel per second.

== See also ==
- American Iron and Steel Institute
- British Steel Corporation
- Dominion Steel and Coal Corporation in Canada
- Steelmaking

== Bibliography ==
- Ashton, T. S. Iron and Steel in the Industrial Revolution (2nd edn., 1951).
- Bernal, John Desmond, Science and Industry in the Nineteenth Century, Indiana University Press, 1970.
- D’Costa, Anthony P. The Global Restructuring of the Steel Industry: Innovations, Institutions, and Industrial Change London: Routledge, 1999
- Hasegawa, Harukiyu. The Steel Industry in Japan: A Comparison with Britain 1996
- Landes, David S., The Unbound Prometheus: Technical Change and Industrial Development in Western Europe from 1750 to the Present (2nd ed. Cambridge University Press, 2003)
- Pounds, Norman J. G., and William N. Parker; Coal and Steel in Western Europe; the Influence of Resources and Techniques on Production (Indiana University Press, 1957)
- Singer, Charles Joseph, ed. A history of technology: vol 4: The Industrial Revolution c 1750–c 1860 (1960) ch 4, and vol 5: The Late Nineteenth Century, c 1850–c 1900, ch 3; online at ACLS e-books
- Stoddard, Brooke C. Steel: From Mine to Mill, the Metal that Made America (2015) short, global popular history excerpt
- Woytinsky, W. S., and E. S. Woytinsky. World Population and Production Trends and Outlooks (1953) pp 1098–1143, with many tables and maps on the worldwide steel industry
- Yonekura, Seiichiro. The Japanese iron and steel industry: Continuity and discontinuity, 1850–1970 (1994) excerpt and text search

=== Britain ===
- Birch, Alan. Economic History of the British Iron and Steel Industry (Routledge, 2013).
- Burn, D. L. “Recent Trends in the History of the Steel Industry.” Economic History Review, 17#2 1947, pp. 95–102. online.
- Burn, Duncan. The Steel Industry, 1939–1959: A Study in Competition and Planning (1961)
- Burn, Duncan. The Economic History of Steelmaking, 1867–1939: A Study in Competition. Cambridge University Press, 1961
- Carr, J. C. and W. Taplin; History of the British Steel Industry Harvard University Press, 1962
- Tweedale, Geoffrey. Steel City: Entrepreneurship, Strategy, and Technology in Sheffield, 1743–1993. (Oxford U.P. 1995)
- Vaizy, John. The history of British steel (1974), well illustrated
- Warren, Kenneth. British Iron and Sheet Steel Industry since 1840 (1970) ISBN 0713515481 Economic geography.

=== United States ===
- Hoerr, John P. And the Wolf Finally Came: The Decline of the American Steel Industry (1988) excerpt and text search
- Hogan, William T. Economic History of the Iron and Steel Industry in the United States (5 vol 1971) monumental detail
- Ingham, John N. The Iron Barons: A Social Analysis of an American Urban Elite, 1874-1965 (1978)
- Krass, Peter. Carnegie (2002). ISBN 0-471-38630-8.
- Livesay, Harold C. Andrew Carnegie and the Rise of Big Business, 2nd Edition (1999). ISBN 0-321-43287-8.
- Misa, Thomas J. A Nation of Steel: The Making of Modern America, 1865–1925 (1995) Chapter 1 "The Dominance of Rails"
- Nasaw, David. Andrew Carnegie (The Penguin Press, 2006).
- Paskoff, Paul F. Iron and Steel in the Nineteenth Century (Encyclopedia of American Business History and Biography) (1989) 385 pp; biographies and brief corporate histories
- Rogers, Robert P. An Economic History of the American Steel Industry (2009) excerpt and text search
- Scamehorn, H. Lee. Mill & Mine: The Cf&I in the Twentieth Century University of Nebraska Press, 1992
- Scheuerman, William. The Steel Crisis: The Economics and Politics of a Declining Industry (1986)
- Skrabec Jr, Quentin R. The Carnegie Boys: The Lieutenants of Andrew Carnegie that Changed America (McFarland, 2012).
- Seely, Bruce E., ed The Iron and Steel Industry in the 20th Century (1994) (Encyclopedia of American Business History and Biography)
- Temin, Peter. Iron and Steel in Nineteenth-Century America, An Economic Inquiry (1964)
- Wall, Joseph Frazier. Andrew Carnegie (1989). ISBN 0-8229-5904-6.
- Warren, Kenneth, Big Steel: The First Century of the United States Steel Corporation, 1901–2001. (University of Pittsburgh Press, 2001) online review
- Warren, Kenneth. Bethlehem Steel: Builder and Arsenal of America (2010) excerpt and text search
- Warren, Kenneth. The American Steel Industry, 1850–1970: A Geographical Interpretation (1973) (ISBN 0198232144)
- Whaples, Robert. "Andrew Carnegie", EH.Net Encyclopedia of Economic and Business History online
- U.S. Steel's History of U.S. Steel
- Urofsky, Melvin I. Big Steel and the Wilson Administration: A Study in Business-Government Relations (1969)

==== U.S. Labor ====
- Brody, David. Labor in Crisis: The Steel Strike of 1919 (1965)
- Mary Margaret Fonow; Union Women: Forging Feminism in the United Steelworkers of America (University of Minnesota Press, 2003)
- U.S. Steel's History of U.S. Steel
- Urofsky, Melvin I. Big Steel and the Wilson Administration: A Study in Business-Government Relations (1969)

=== Primary sources ===
- U.S. Commissioner of Corporations. Report on the Steel Industry (1913).
- Warne, Colston E. ed. The Steel Strike of 1919 (1963), primary and secondary documents
