= Electric furnace =

Electric furnace may refer to:

== Heat-producing equipment ==
- An electric furnace
- A central heating plant for a home or building
- An electric arc furnace used for steel making and smelting of certain ores
- An industrial heat treating furnace
- An electrically heated kiln
- An induction furnace used for preparation of special alloys
- A modern muffle furnace

== Other uses ==
- Electric Furnace (band), a Welsh heavy metal band

== See also ==
- Furnace (house heating)
