= Metallurgical furnace =

Device used to heat, melt, or otherwise process metals

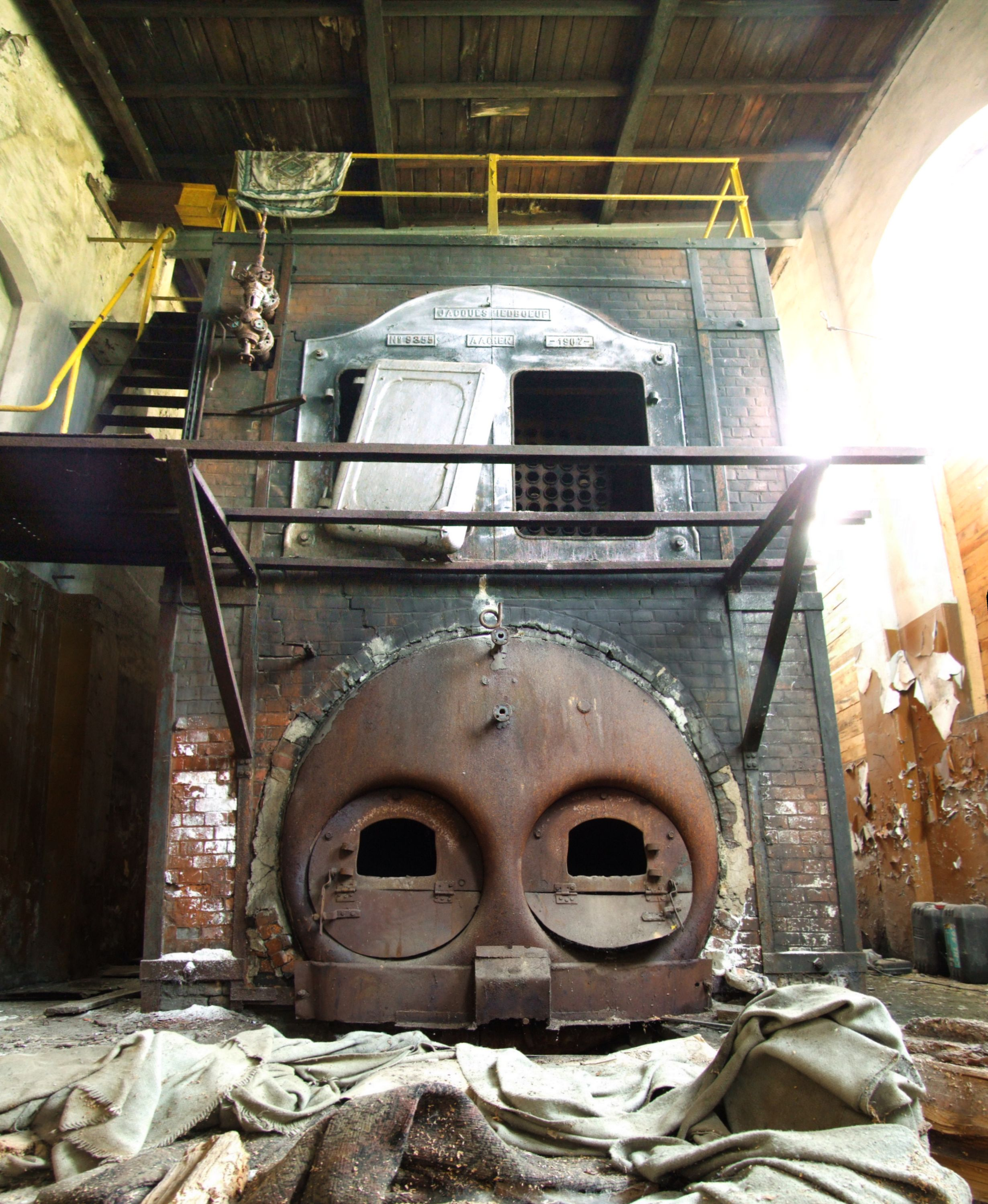
Industrial furnace from 1907.

A metallurgical furnace is an industrial furnace used to heat, melt, or otherwise process metals. Furnaces have been a central piece of equipment throughout the history of metallurgy; processing metals with heat is even its own engineering specialty known as pyrometallurgy.

One important furnace application, especially in iron and steel production, is smelting, where metal ores are reduced under high heat to separate the metal content from mineral gangue. The heat energy to fuel a furnace may be supplied directly by fuel combustion or by electricity. Different processes and the unique properties of specific metals and ores have led to many different furnace types.

== Air blast furnaces ==
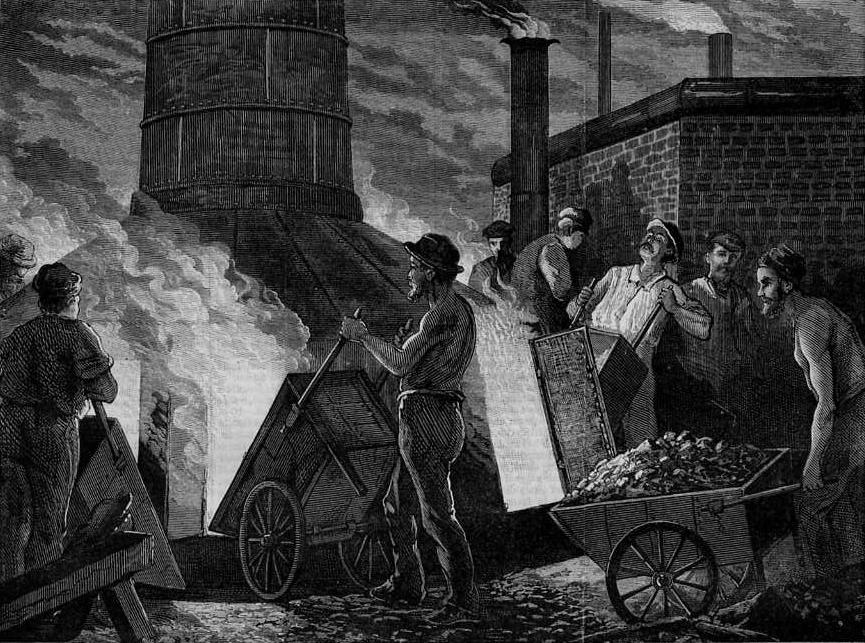
The Manufacture of Iron -- Filling the Furnace, an 1873 wood engraving

Many furnace designs for smelting combine ore, fuel, and other reagents like flux in a single chamber. Mechanisms, such as bellows or motorized fans, then drive pressurized blasts of air into the chamber. These blasts make the fuel burn hotter and drive chemical reactions.

Furnaces of this type include:

- The blast furnace, used to produce pig iron from iron ore. These can be subdivided into:
  - Cold blast furnaces
  - Hot blast furnaces
- The bloomery, a precursor to the blast furnace that produces sponge iron from ore
- The blowing house, a traditional furnace for smelting tin
- The smeltmill, a traditional furnace for smelting lead

=== Blowing in ===
Even smaller, pre-industrial bloomeries possess significant thermal mass. Raising a cold furnace to the necessary temperature for smelting iron requires a significant amount of energy, regardless of modern technology. For this reason, metallurgists will try their best to keep blast furnaces running continuously, and shutting down a furnace is seen as an unfortunate event.

Conversely, starting up a new furnace, or one that had been temporarily shut down, is often a special occasion. In traditional bloomeries, several rounds of fuel would need to be burnt away before the furnace was ready to accept a charge of ore. In English, this process became known as "blowing in" the furnace, while a furnace that had to be shut down and went cold had been "blown out", terms that are still applied to contemporary blast furnaces.

== Reverberatory furnaces ==
A reverberatory furnace still exposes the reaction chamber, where metal or ore is combined with reagents, to a stream of exhaust gases. However, no fuel is directly added to the chamber, and combustion occurs in a separate chamber. Furnaces of this type include:

- The open hearth furnace, a 19th-20th century steelmaking method for refining pig iron into steel
- The puddling furnace, an 18th-19th century method for refining pig iron into wrought iron

== Refining converters ==
In metallurgy, furnaces used to refine metals further, particularly iron into steel, are also often called converters:

- Steelmaking converters
  - The basic oxygen furnace
  - The Bessemer converter
- The Manhès–David converter for refining copper matte into pure "blister" copper

== Electric furnaces ==
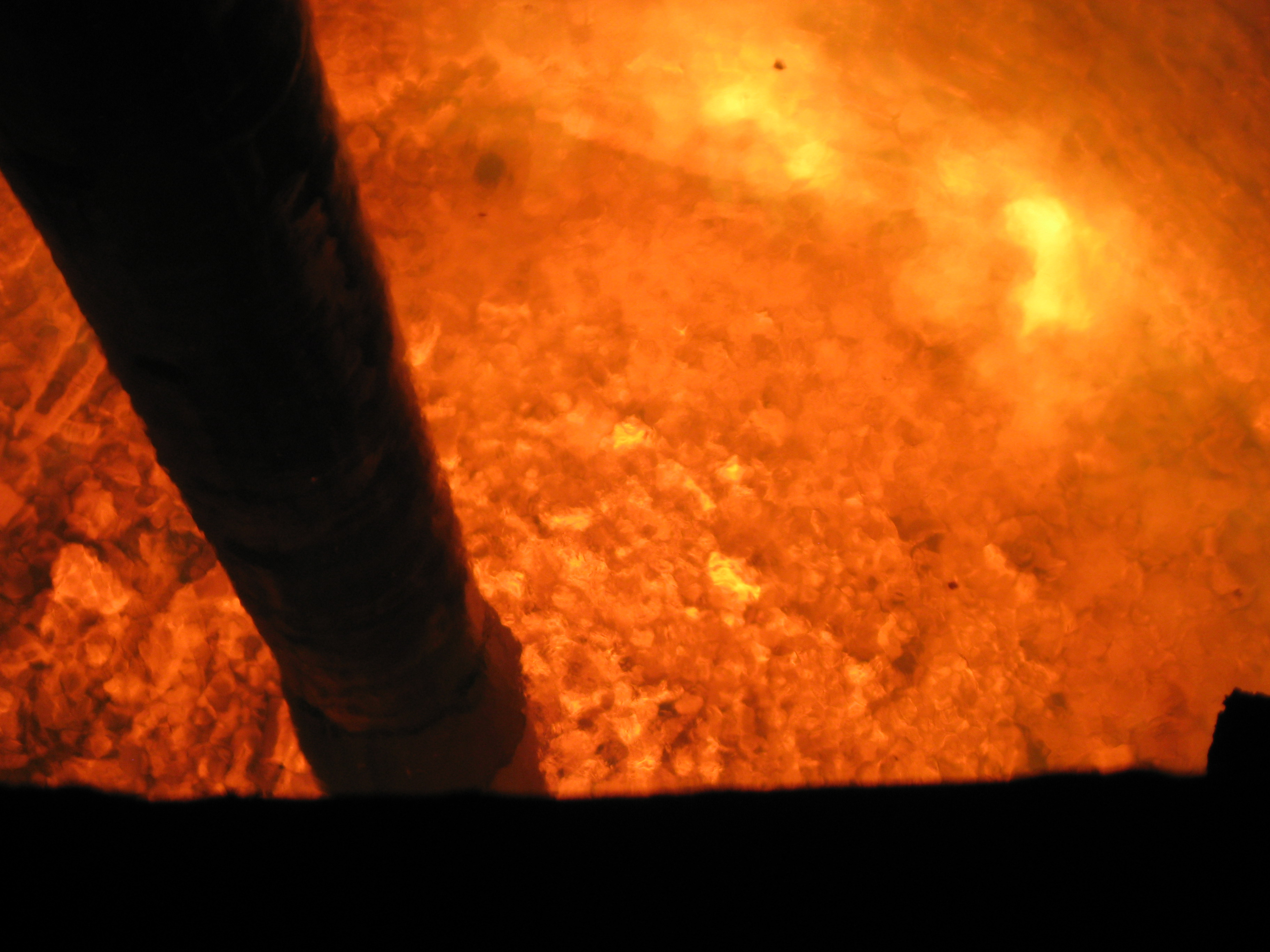
Modern TLS furnace used in copper smelting during heat up.

Just as other industries have trended towards electrification, electric furnaces have become prevalent in metallurgy. However, while any furnace can theoretically use an electrical heating element, process specifics mostly limit this approach to furnaces with lower power demands.

Instead, electric metallurgical furnaces often apply an electric current directly to batches of metal. This is particularly useful for recycling (still relatively pure) scrap metal, or remelting ingots for casting in foundries. The absence of any fuel or exhaust gases also makes these designs versatile for heating all kinds of metals. (Note: The absence of any additional chemistry is not always an advantage though. For example, smelting iron is still mostly done with blast furnaces, partly because the carbon monoxide created by burning coke is also excellent for chemically reducing the iron.) Such designs include:

- Electric arc furnaces (EAFs), which apply current to the metal via electrodes over an electric arc
  - The Flodin furnace is an early EAF, specially designed to smelt iron from ore through the direct addition of carbon
- Electric induction furnaces, which heat the metal through eddy currents, requiring metal mostly free of gangue and corrosion

== Other furnaces ==
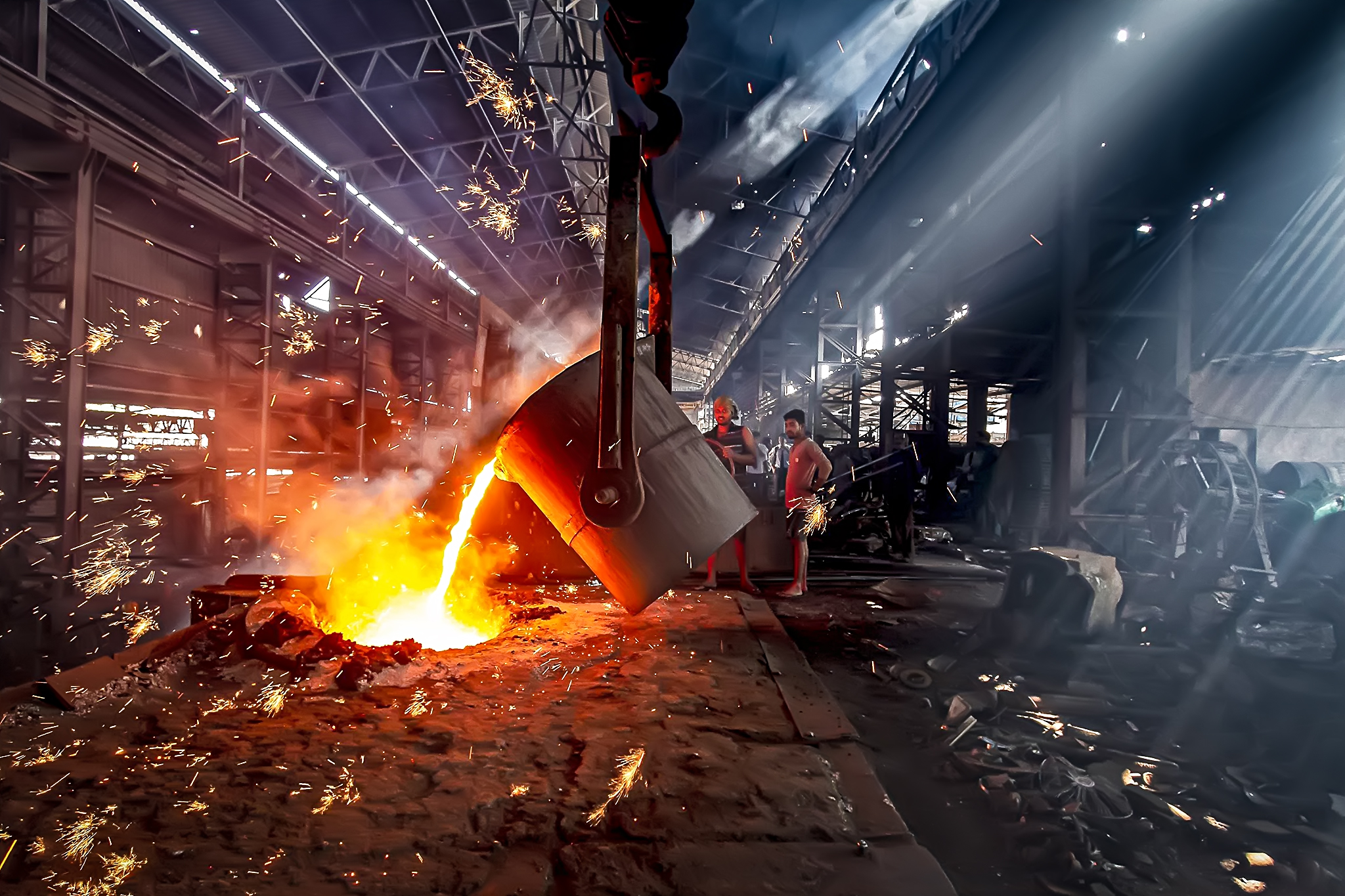
Metallurgical furnace in operation inside an industrial foundry in Guwahati, Assam, India, showing molten metal being poured and workers engaged in the smelting process.

Other metallurgical furnaces have special design features or uses. One function is heating material short of melting, in order to perform heat treatment or hot working. Basic furnaces used this way include:

- A forge is the traditional metalsmith's hearth for heating metal while forging
- Soaking pits are large heated chambers, typically in-ground, where steel slabs are reheated before rolling

Another class of furnaces isolate the material from the surrounding atmosphere and contaminants, enabling advanced heat treatments and other techniques:

- Muffle furnaces enclose the material to keep out contaminants and divert any exhaust away from the area
- Autoclaves are reinforced, seal airtight, and can expose material to heat and elevated pressure
- Vacuum furnaces are similar to autoclaves, but expose the material to a vacuum instead
