= 2026 in Guernsey =

Events in the year 2026 in Guernsey.

== Incumbents ==
- Duke of Normandy: Charles III
- Lieutenant governor: Richard Cripwell
- Bailiff: Richard McMahon

== Events ==
- 8 June: Major tax reforms are proposed, which would see 3% goods and services tax as well as vehicle taxation.

== Sports ==
- July: Guernsey at the 2026 Commonwealth Games
