= GST =

GST may refer to:

== Taxes ==
- General sales tax
- Goods and services tax, the name for the value-added tax in several jurisdictions:
  - Goods and services tax (Australia)
  - Goods and services tax (Canada)
  - Goods and services tax (Hong Kong)
  - Goods and Services Tax (India)
    - Goods and Services Tax (India) Bill
    - Goods and Services Tax (India) Revenue Statistics
  - Goods and Services Tax (Malaysia)
  - Goods and Services Tax (New Zealand)
  - Goods and Services Tax (Singapore)
- Generation-skipping transfer tax, in the United States

== Science and technology ==
=== Computing ===
- Generalized suffix tree
- GeSbTe, a phase-change material
- GST Computer Systems, a group of British software developers
- GStreamer, a multimedia framework

=== Vehicles ===
- GST Catalina, a US flying boat
- Vision GST, a Mercedes-Benz concept car

=== Other uses in science and technology ===
- Gene-specific tag (also referred to as SNP)
- General set theory
- General strain theory, in sociology
- General systems theory
- Generalized structure tensor
- Global surface temperature
- Glutathione S-transferase, an enzyme family
- Goode Solar Telescope, in California

== Timekeeping ==
- Gulf Standard Time, in the Middle East
- Greenwich Sidereal Time, used in astronomy
- Galileo System Time

== Businesses and organizations ==
- Danish Geodata Agency (Geodatastyrelsen)
- General Staff (Sweden), a former agency of the Government of Sweden
- German Steel Trust, a German steel company
- Gerolsteiner (cycling team)
- Gesellschaft für Sport und Technik, a former East German mass organization providing mandatory pre-military training
- Groupe socialiste des travailleurs du Québec, a defunct political movement in Canada
- Gulf States Toyota Distributors, an American automobile distributor
- SIES Graduate School of Technology, in Mumbai, India

== Other uses ==
- G-TELP, an English language test
- Girmit Soccer Tournament, afootball tournament in Fiji
- Grand Slam Track, a professional track and field league
- Grand Southern Trunk Road, in India
- Greystone (CIA operation), a former secret codeword relating to counter-terrorism programs of the CIA after 9/11
- Gustavus Airport, in Alaska

== See also ==
- Black GST, an Indigenous Australian political movement
