= Induction furnace =

Electric furnace using induction heat

An induction furnace is an electrical furnace in which the heat is applied by induction heating of metal. Induction furnace capacities range from less than one kilogram to one hundred tons, and are used to melt iron and steel, copper, aluminum, and precious metals.

The advantage of the induction furnace is a clean, energy-efficient and well-controlled melting process, compared to most other means of metal melting.

Most modern foundries use this type of furnace, and many iron foundries are replacing cupola furnaces with induction furnaces to melt cast iron, as the former emit much dust and other pollutants.

Induction furnaces do not require an arc, as in an electric arc furnace, or combustion, as in a blast furnace. As a result, the temperature of the charge (the material entered into the furnace for heating, not to be confused with electric charge) is no higher than required to melt it; this can prevent the loss of valuable alloying elements.

The one major drawback to induction furnace usage in a foundry is the lack of refining capacity: charge materials must be free of oxides and be of a known composition, and some alloying elements may be lost due to oxidation, so they must be re-added to the melt.

== Types ==
In the coreless type, metal is placed in a crucible surrounded by a water-cooled alternating current solenoid coil. A channel-type induction furnace has a loop of molten metal, which forms a single-turn secondary winding through an iron core.

== Operation ==
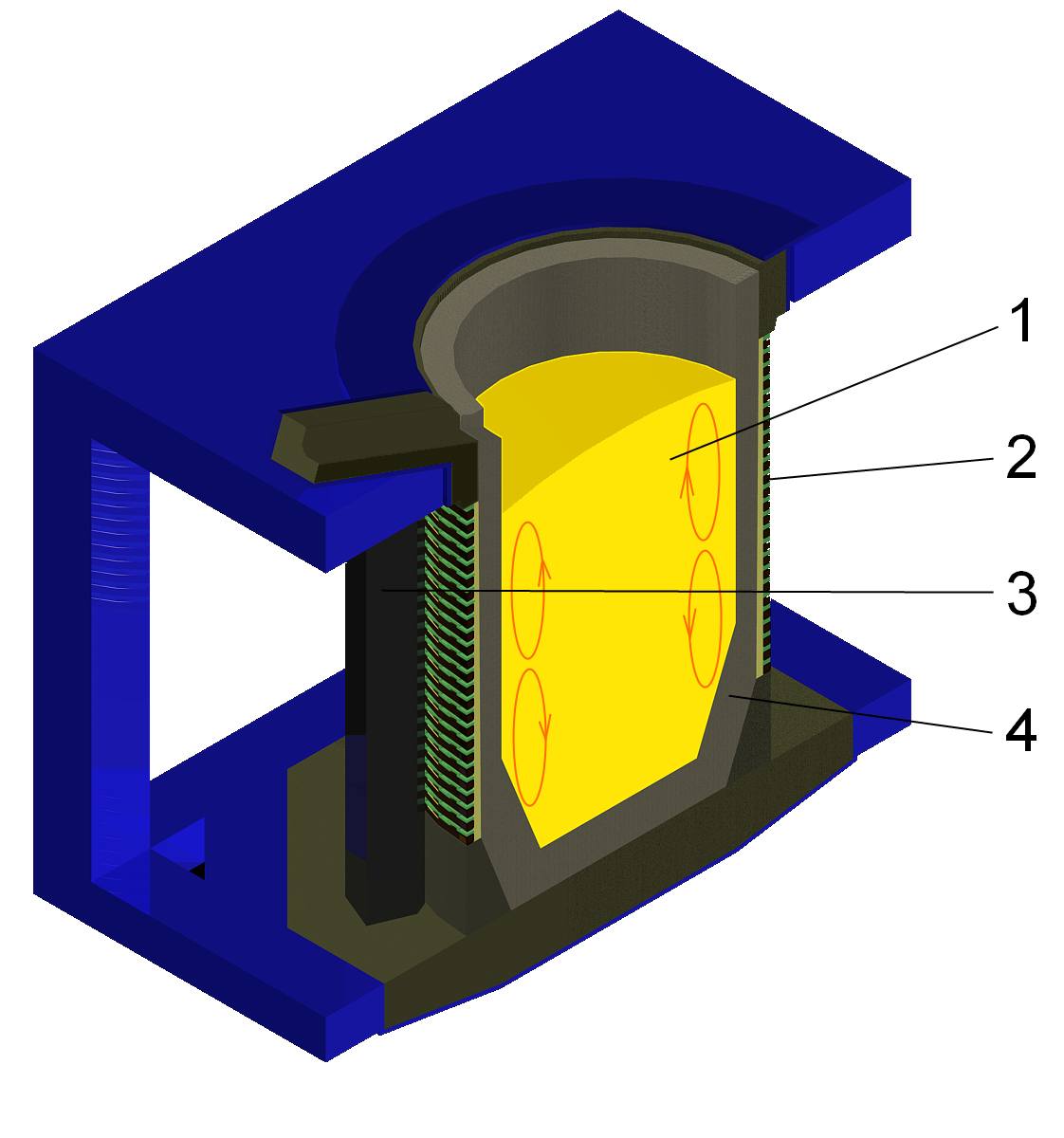
1 - Melt 2 - water-cooled coil 3 - yokes 4 - crucible

An induction furnace consists of a nonconductive crucible holding the charge of metal to be melted, surrounded by a coil of copper wire. A powerful alternating current flows through the wire. The coil creates a rapidly reversing magnetic field that penetrates the metal. The magnetic field induces eddy currents, circular electric currents, inside the metal, by electromagnetic induction. The eddy currents, flowing through the electrical resistance of the bulk metal, heat it by Joule heating. In ferromagnetic materials like iron, the material may also be heated by magnetic hysteresis, the reversal of the molecular magnetic dipoles in the metal. Once melted, the eddy currents cause vigorous stirring of the melt, assuring good mixing.

An advantage of induction heating is that the heat is generated within the furnace's charge itself rather than applied by a burning fuel or other external heat source, which can be important in applications where contamination is an issue.

Operating frequencies range from utility frequency (50 or 60 Hz) to 400 kHz or higher, usually depending on the material being melted, the capacity (volume) of the furnace and the melting speed required. Generally, the smaller the volume of the melts, the higher the frequency of the furnace used; this is due to the skin depth which is a measure of the distance an alternating current can penetrate beneath the surface of a conductor. For the same conductivity, the higher frequencies have a shallow skin depth—that is less penetration into the melt. Lower frequencies can generate stirring or turbulence in the metal.

A preheated, one-ton furnace melting iron can melt cold charge to tapping readiness within an hour. Power supplies range from 10 kW to 42 MW, with melt sizes of 20 kg to 65 tons of metal respectively.

An operating induction furnace usually emits a hum or whine (due to fluctuating magnetic forces and magnetostriction), the pitch of which can be used by operators to identify whether the furnace is operating correctly or at what power level.

== Refractory lining ==
There is a disposable refractory lining used during casting.

== See also ==
- Electric arc furnace—for another type of electric furnace, used in larger foundries and mini-mill steelmaking operations
