= Stassano furnace =

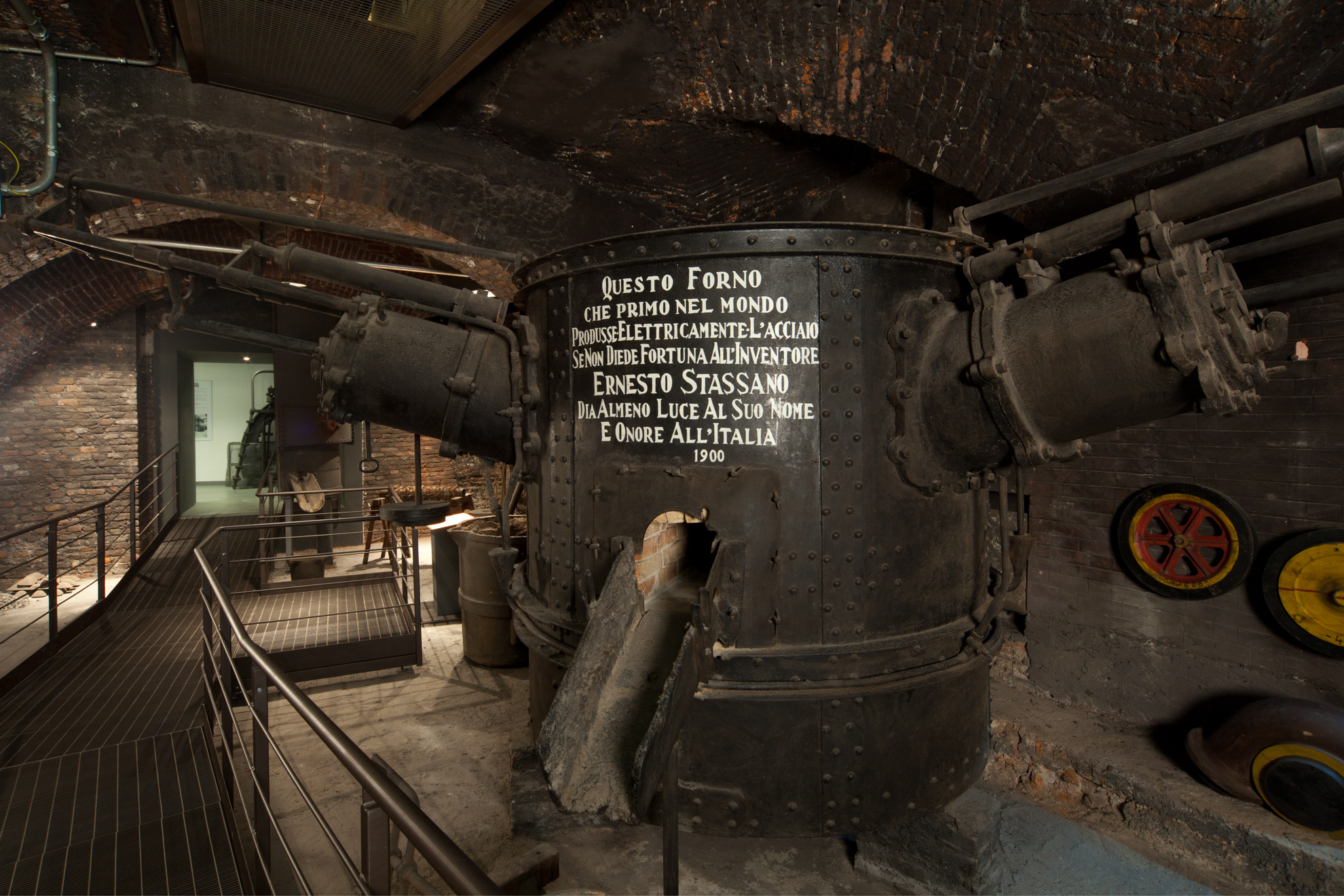
Stassano furnace exhibited at the Museo nazionale della scienza e della tecnologia Leonardo da Vinci

The Stassano furnace is an electric arc furnace for the production of steel. Invented by Ernesto Stassano in 1898, it is the first electric furnace in history for ferrous metallurgy.

== History ==
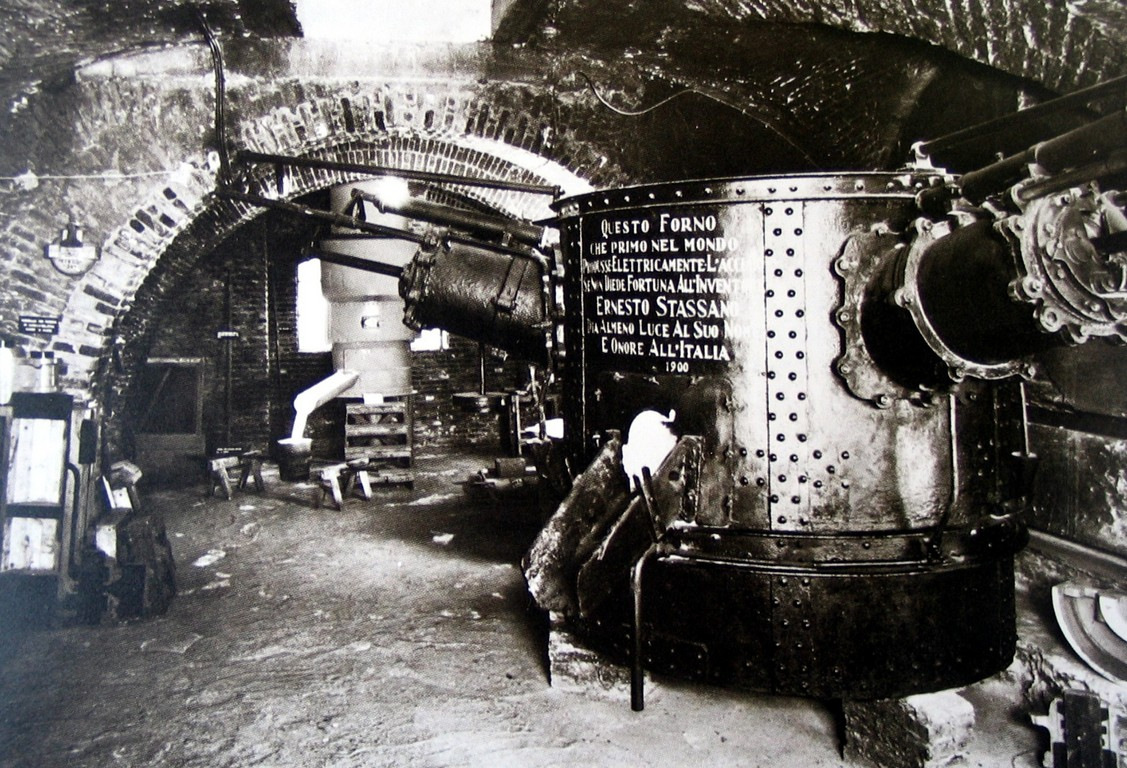
Stassano furnace, 1920

Stassano had the idea of building an electrical furnace for ferrous metallurgy in 1896, while he was working in Pont-Saint-Martin, Aosta Valley, on electrical furnaces for the production of calcium carbide.

Stassano moved to the workshops of Santa Maria dei Cerchi in Rome, in 1898. Here he carried out his first experiments to obtain steel from iron ores using a small shaft furnace equipped with two electrodes capable of heating the minerals thanks to a 95 kW indirect arc. In the same year, in Darfo (BS), he carried out other tests on a similar furnace, equipped with three electrodes working at 370 kW.

As a result of his experiments, Stassano modified the structure of the furnace, reducing the space above the electrodes and separating the section destined to electrodes and the one for the production of the material. He also moved from mineral-only burdens to mixed loads composed of ores, scrap and cast iron. With these adjustments, Stassano obtained high-quality steel from burdens containing 80% scrap and 20% cast iron, thus obtaining a product that could economically compete with imported steel.

In 1898 Stassano patented the principles and technical solutions of his furnaces in Italy, Austria, Spain, Luxembourg, Belgium, Norway, England, Sweden, Germany and USA. In 1901 in France and Hungary, and in 1902 in Switzerland.

Based on the Darfo furnace, in 1901 Stassano produced a furnace with a final configuration and installed it in the Arsenal in Turin.

In 1904 Stassano founded the Società Forni Termoelettrici Stassano (Stassano Society of Thermoelectric Furnaces) and opened in Turin the first foundry where steel was obtained electrically. The foundry was activated in 1905, using for its purposes two 1-ton furnaces, two 2-ton furnaces and one 5-ton furnace.

Between 1906 and 1907 a number of Stassano furnaces were activated at the Bonner Faserfabrik plants in Bonn (Germany), in St. Polen (Austria), in Dunston-on-Tyne and Newcastle (UK), in Bridgeton and Redondo (USA). In 1910 Stassano furnaces will also be installed in the Ansaldo steel plants in Genoa and in the Vanzetti plants in Milan.

Between 1900 and 1915 there are three active types of electric arc furnaces in the industrial field: the Stassano indirect arc furnace, the Heroult direct arc furnace with non-conductive soles, and the Girod direct arc furnace with conductive soles. The Heroult furnace is, among the three, the most suitable for large-scale production, so that its supremacy determines the decline of the Stassano furnace in the steel industry already in 1915.

== Structure ==
The indirect arc electric furnace of the Stassano type, in its final configuration, is made from a cast iron cylindrical structure lined internally with refractory bricks. The structure is divided in two separate sections: an upper section where the electrodes are placed, and a lower crucible where the burden is loaded and fused into steel.

On the upper part of the furnace side wall, in correspondence with the space that houses the three graphite electrodes, are the couplings of the latter, placed at 120° from one another. Each coupling is equipped with a water cooling jacket and a hydraulic system for moving the electrodes. The electrodes are placed in a horizontal position.

In the central part of the side wall, in correspondence with the upper part of the crucible, there is the charge door, equipped with a metal panel coated with internal refractory material and closable with a pulley mechanism. In the lower part of the side wall, in correspondence with the lower part of the crucible, is the taphole. At the centre of the upper base of the oven is an escape tube for gases.

== Operation ==
The Stassano furnace produces steel by fusing scrap iron and cast iron and operating a successive decarburization of the fused material.

The furnace is initially loaded with the material to be fused, which is introduced into the crucible from the charge door. Once the loading is completed, current is sent to the electrodes, which generate an electrical arc between them. The arc produces heat which is transmitted to the material to be melted through thermal radiation heat transfer, which is why the furnace is referred to as an indirect or radiant arc device. During the process, the charge door can be reopened to introduce into the crucible further amounts of scrap and cast iron. When all the material has been melted, it undergoes a first refining before it is poured out from the taphole.
