= Flodin process =

Iron and steel manufacturing process

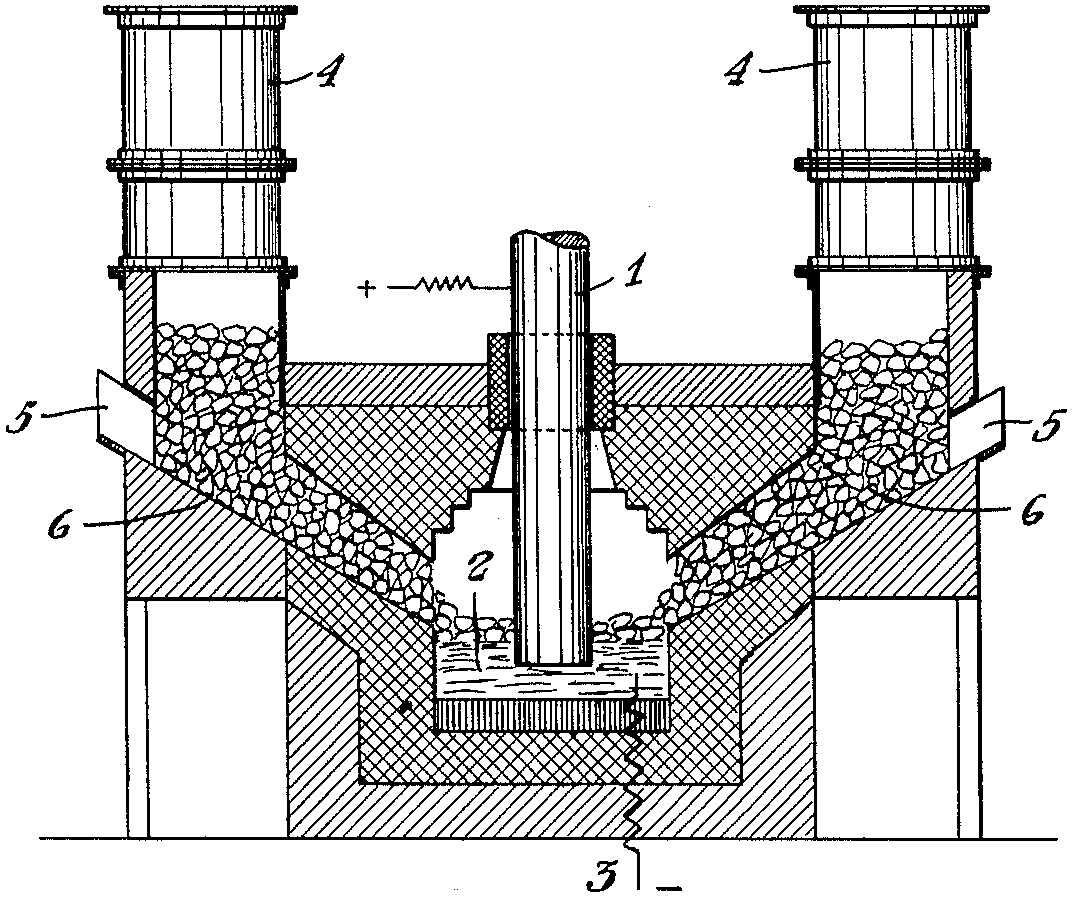
Image of the patent of the furnace

The Flodin process is a direct reduction process for manufacturing modern iron and steel, developed by Gustaf Henning Flodin from Sweden and patented in 1924. It has been used in Norway, Sweden, and the United States. Using a specially constructed electric arc furnace, a mixture of hematite with +0.2% carbon content and coal (or charcoal) is smelted in a continuous process, with the reduced metal accumulating at the bottom of the furnace, where it can be tapped off. Carbon content in the product can be controlled by changing the quantity of coal in the furnace. Noncorroding chromium steel could also be produced by using impure ore instead of hematite. Likewise, spongy iron can be cast by using coal-lime briquettes. Additionally, the Flodin furnace also can be used to produce so-called 'soft steel'.
