= Electric Furnace (band) =

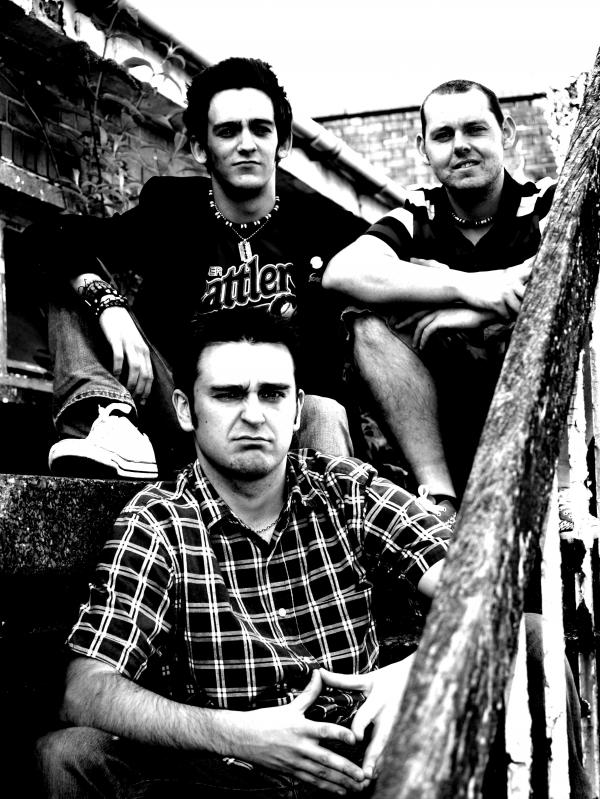

Background information
- Origin: Rhondda, Wales, UK
- Genres: Metal, rock, thrash
- Years active: 2010–present
- Label: Gepetto Records
- Members: Alex Kilby; Michael Thompson; Gareth Westwood
- Website: Electric Furnace

Electric Furnace are a three-piece metal band from South Wales, formed in 2010. The group was founded by guitarist Alex Kilby and former drummer Gareth Westwood who were both in infamous South Wales hard rock/punk band First Among Equals. Recruiting Michael Thompson who formerly drummed for The Donde Stars and with Gareth Westwood switching from drums to bass, the three merged to form Electric Furnace. Their sound is predominantly heavy metal. They cite influences such as Anthrax, Judas Priest and Metallica. Electric Furnace signed a distribution deal with Italian label Gepetto Records in July 2010.

== Releases ==
Electric Furnace released on 1 October 2010 their debut EP entitled "Sound & Fury" which is released and distributed worldwide by Gepetto Records. Online retailer CDBaby described the new release as "A band that fuses classic metal and heavy rock with a modern edge. Riff heavy, hard hitting heavy metal".

== Live performances ==
Anticipation for Electric Furnace's first gig ran high in the South Wales music scene and they gave their first public performance on 24 April 2010 at new music venue The Green Rooms in Treforest, who described their performance as "playing guitar-driven, heavy rock-metal, who didn’t disappoint and you can tell these guys are old pros at live performance".

== Reviews ==
Lee Eynon of God Is in the TV Magazine reviewed the new EP describing the sound as "pure unashamed, gurning, foot-on-the-monitor Metal, with no pretensions to being profound – the songs are about vampires, cowboys and drunken mothers for god’s sake – and its great fun. The length of some of the tracks might make them hard going if you only occasionally dip your toe in 'proper metal', but the target audience will love it."
