= Electric arc furnace =

Type of furnace

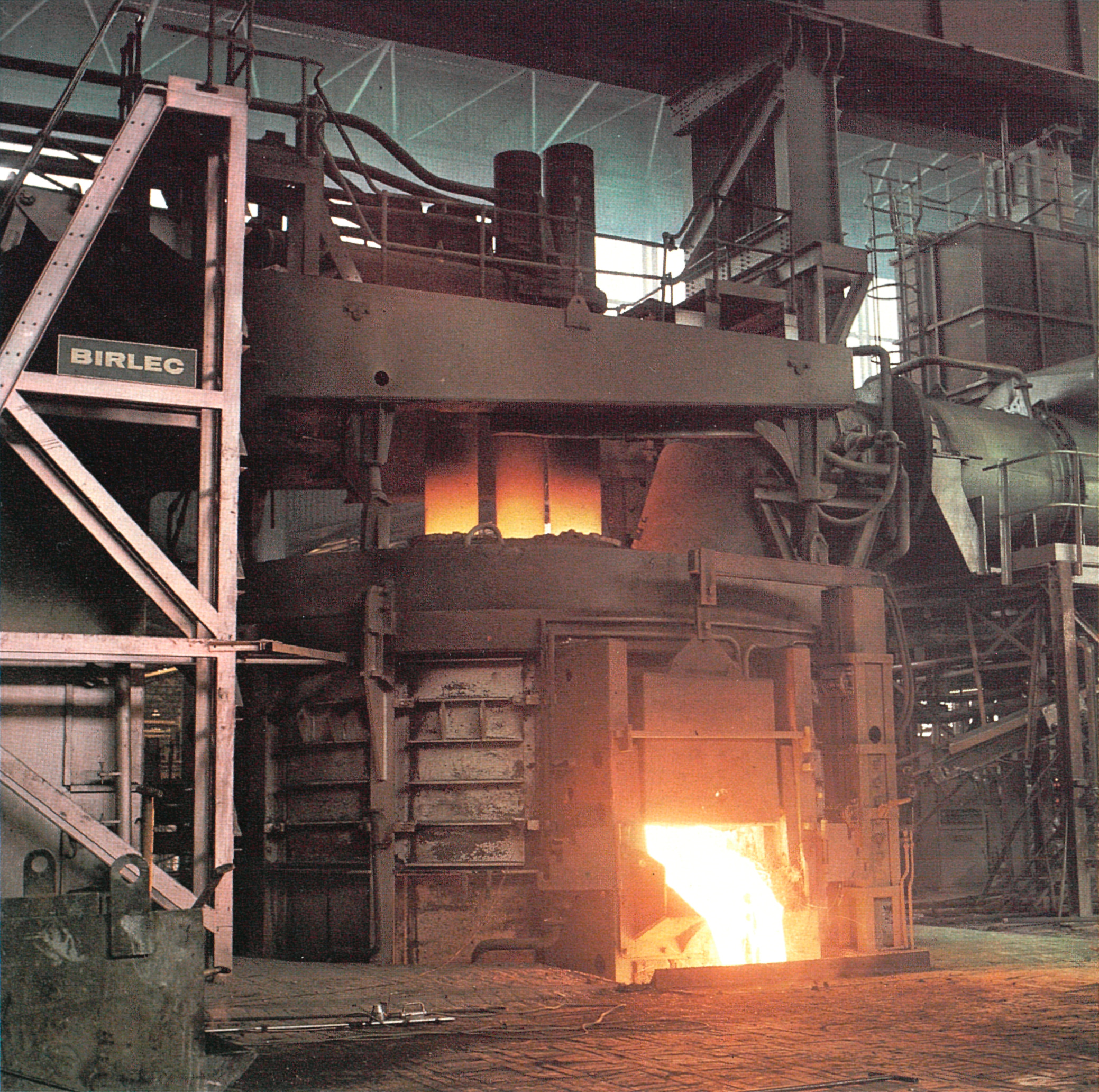
An electric arc furnace during operation, c. 1975

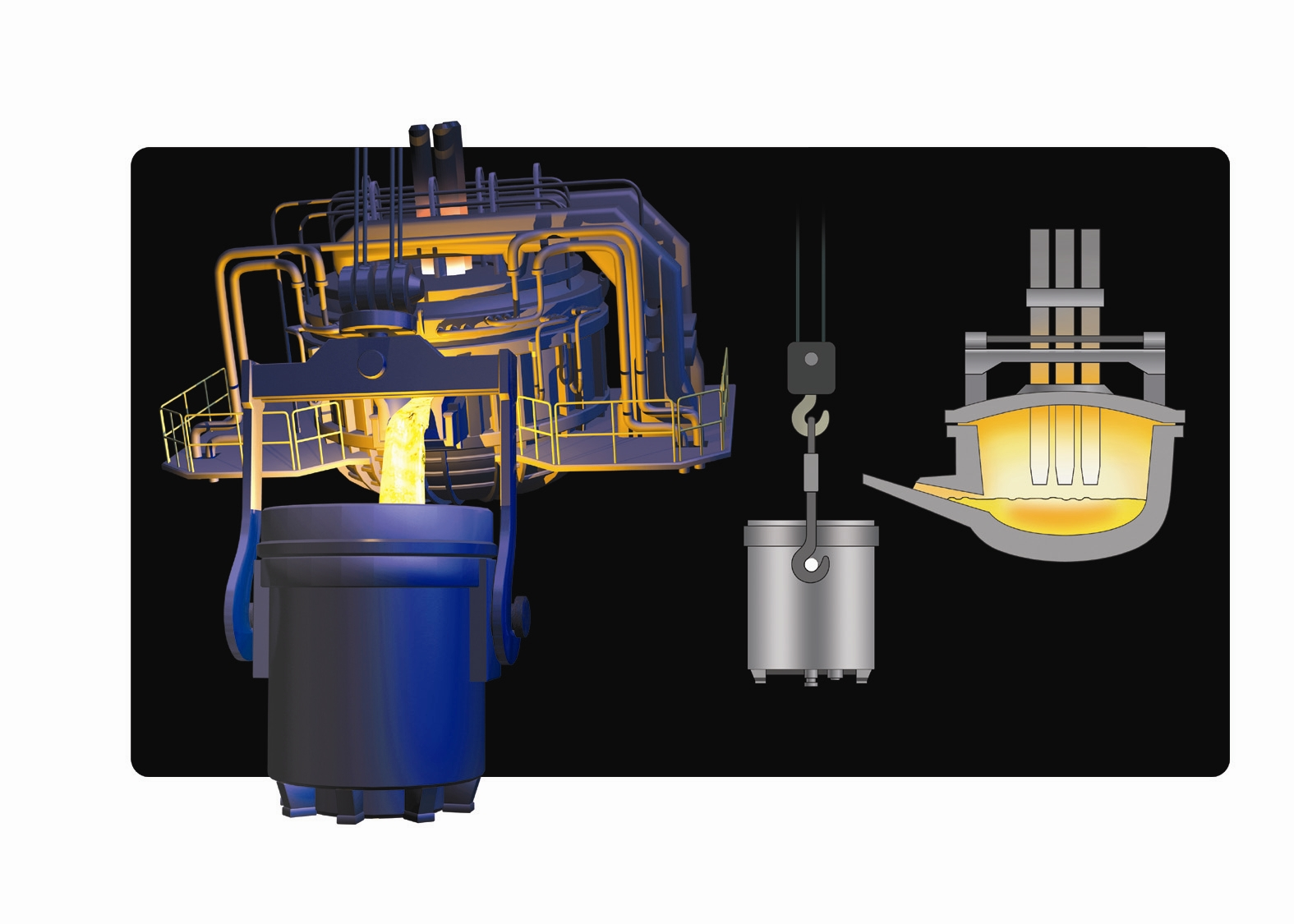
Rendering of exterior and interior of an electric arc furnace.

An electric arc furnace (EAF) is a furnace that heats material by means of an electric arc.

Industrial arc furnaces range in size from small units of approximately one-tonne capacity (used in foundries for producing cast iron products) up to about 400-tonne units used for secondary steelmaking. Arc furnaces used in research laboratories and by dentists may have a capacity of only a few dozen grams. Industrial electric arc furnace temperatures can reach 1,800 °C (3,300 °F), while laboratory units can exceed 3,000 °C (5,400 °F).

In electric arc furnaces, the material inside the furnace (referred to as a charge) is directly exposed to an electric arc, and the current from the electrode terminals passes through the charge material. Arc furnaces differ from induction furnaces, which use eddy currents to heat the charge.

== History ==
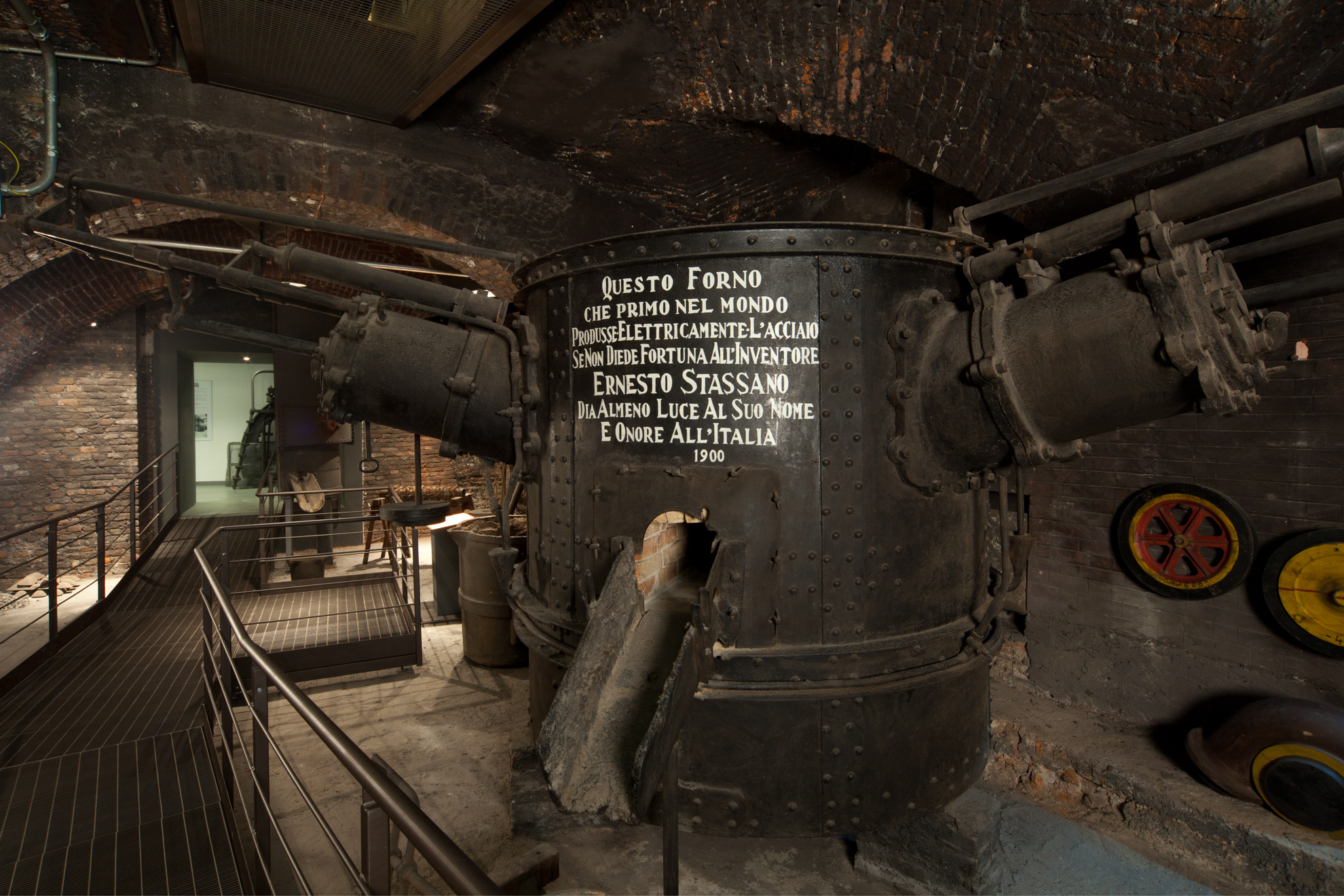
Stassano furnace exhibited at the Museo della Scienza e della Tecnologia "Leonardo da Vinci", Milan

In the 19th century, a number of people had employed an electric arc to melt iron. The possibility of using an electric arc to melt metals was demonstrated by Vasily Vladimirovich Petrov in 1803. Sir Humphry Davy conducted an experimental demonstration in 1810; welding was investigated by William Haseldine Pepys in 1815; Pinchon attempted to create an electrothermic furnace in 1853; and, in 1878–79, Sir William Siemens took out patents for electric furnaces of the arc type.

The first successful and operational furnace was invented by James Burgess Readman in Edinburgh, Scotland, in 1888 and patented in 1889. This was specifically for the creation of phosphorus.

Further electric arc furnaces were developed by Paul Héroult, of France, with a commercial plant established in the United States in 1907. The Sanderson brothers formed The Sanderson Brothers Steel Co. in Syracuse, New York, installing the first electric arc furnace in the U.S. This furnace is now on display at Station Square, Pittsburgh, Pennsylvania.

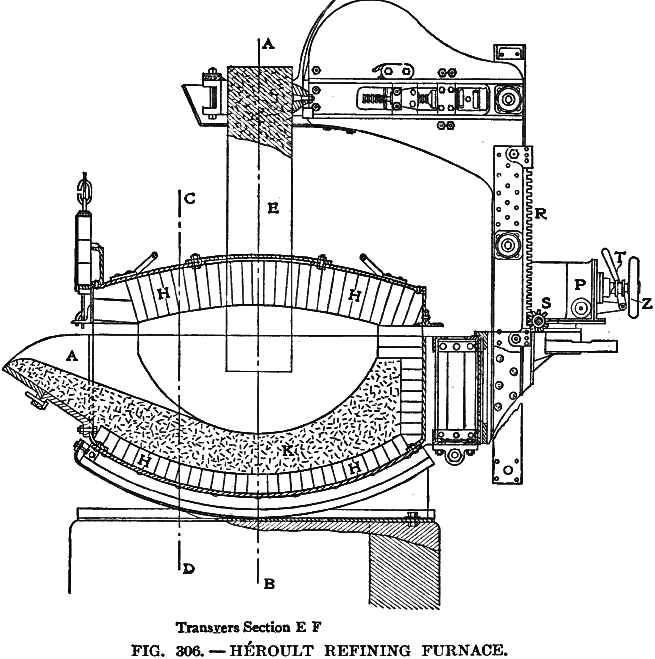
A schematic cross section through a Heroult arc furnace. E is an electrode (only one shown), raised and lowered by the rack and pinion drive R and S. The interior is lined with refractory brick H, and K denotes the bottom lining. A door at A allows access to the interior. The furnace shell rests on rockers to allow it to be tilted for tapping.

Initially "electric steel" produced by an electric arc furnace was a specialty product for such uses as machine tools and spring steel. Arc furnaces were also used to prepare calcium carbide for use in carbide lamps. The Stassano electric furnace is an arc type furnace that usually rotates to mix the bath. The Girod furnace is similar to the Héroult furnace.

While EAFs were widely used in World War II for production of alloy steels, it was only later that electric steelmaking began to expand. The low capital cost for a mini-mill—around US$140–200 per ton of annual installed capacity, compared with US$1,000 per ton of annual installed capacity for an integrated steel mill—allowed mills to be quickly established in war-ravaged Europe, and also allowed them to successfully compete with the big United States steelmakers, such as Bethlehem Steel and U.S. Steel, for low-cost, carbon steel "long products" (structural steel, rod and bar, wire, and fasteners) in the U.S. market.

As of January 2022, Nucor was one of the largest steel producers in the US. It entered the market for long steel products in 1969, using a mini-mill with an EAF as its steelmaking furnace, which was soon followed by other manufacturers. While Nucor expanded rapidly in the Eastern US, the companies that followed them into mini-mill operations concentrated on local markets for long products, where the EAF allowed the plants to vary production according to local demand. This pattern was followed globally, with EAF steel production primarily used for long products, while integrated mills, using blast furnaces and basic oxygen furnaces, cornered the markets for "flat products"—sheet steel and heavier steel plate.

In 1987, Nucor expanded into the flat products market, still using the EAF production method.

== Construction ==
A schematic cross-section through an EAF. Three electrodes (yellow), molten bath (gold), tapping spout at left, refractory brick movable roof, brick shell, and a refractory-lined bowl-shaped hearth.

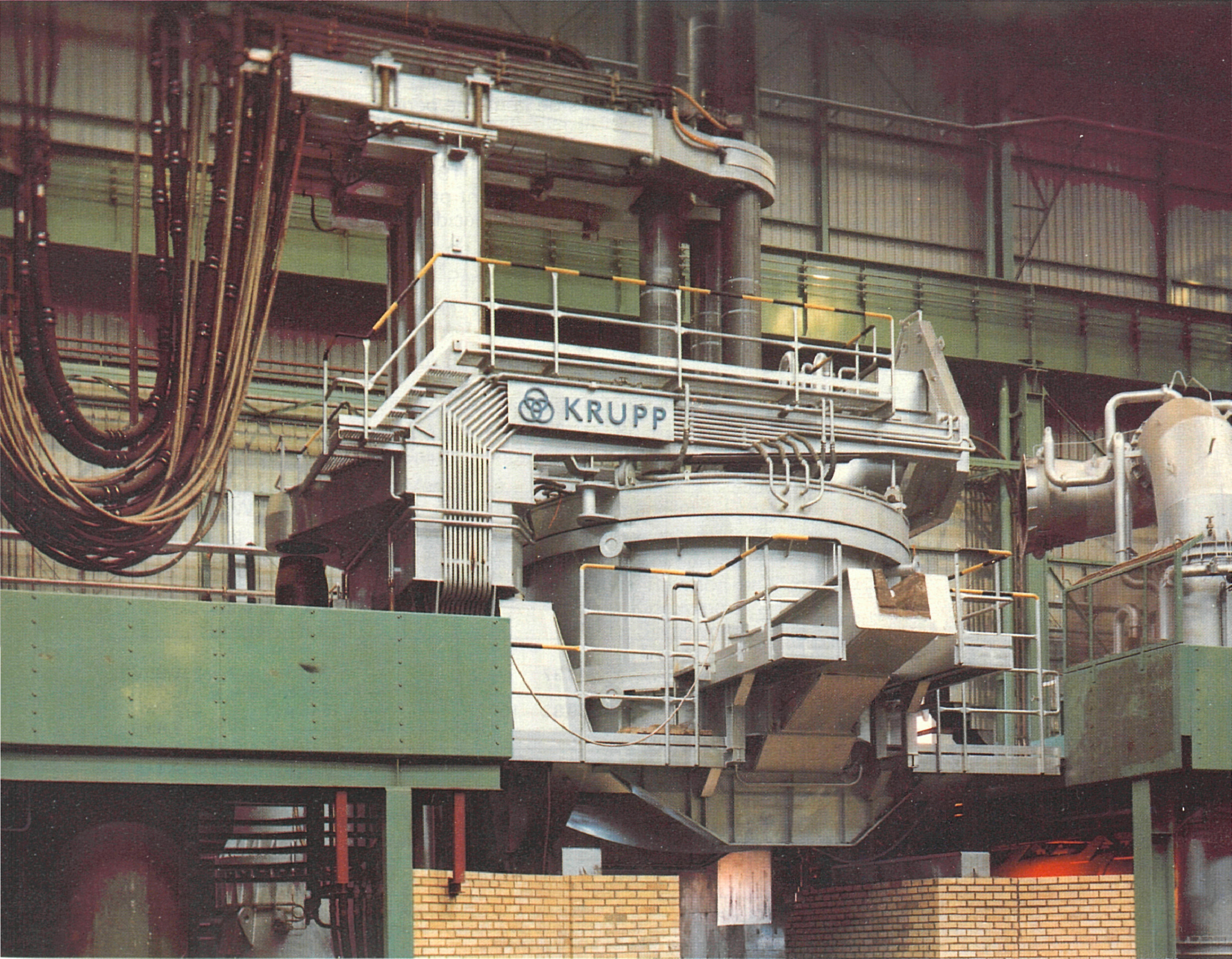
A general overview of a typical AC (Alternating Current) electric arc furnace with three electrodes. All relevant hardware (except the transformer vault to left) are visible, such as water-cooled power cables, painted copper electrode arms, swing roof, refaractory-lined cylindrical melting hearth, tap spout, tilting mechanism, and exhaust ducting.

An electric arc furnace used for steelmaking consists of a refractory-lined vessel, usually water-cooled in larger sizes, covered with a retractable roof, and through which one or more graphite electrodes enter the furnace. The furnace is primarily split into three sections:

- the shell, which consists of the sidewalls and lower steel "bowl";
- the hearth, which consists of the refractory that lines the lower bowl;
- the roof, which may be refractory-lined or water-cooled, and can be shaped as a section of a sphere, or as a frustum (conical section). The roof also supports the refractory delta in its centre, through which one or more graphite electrodes enter.

The hearth may be hemispherical in shape, or in an eccentric bottom tapping furnace (see below), the hearth has the shape of a halved egg. In modern meltshops, the furnace is often raised off the ground floor, so that ladles and slag pots can easily be maneuvered under either end of the furnace. Separate from the furnace structure is the electrode support and electrical system, and the tilting platform on which the furnace rests. Two configurations are possible: the electrode supports and the roof tilt with the furnace, or are fixed to the raised platform.

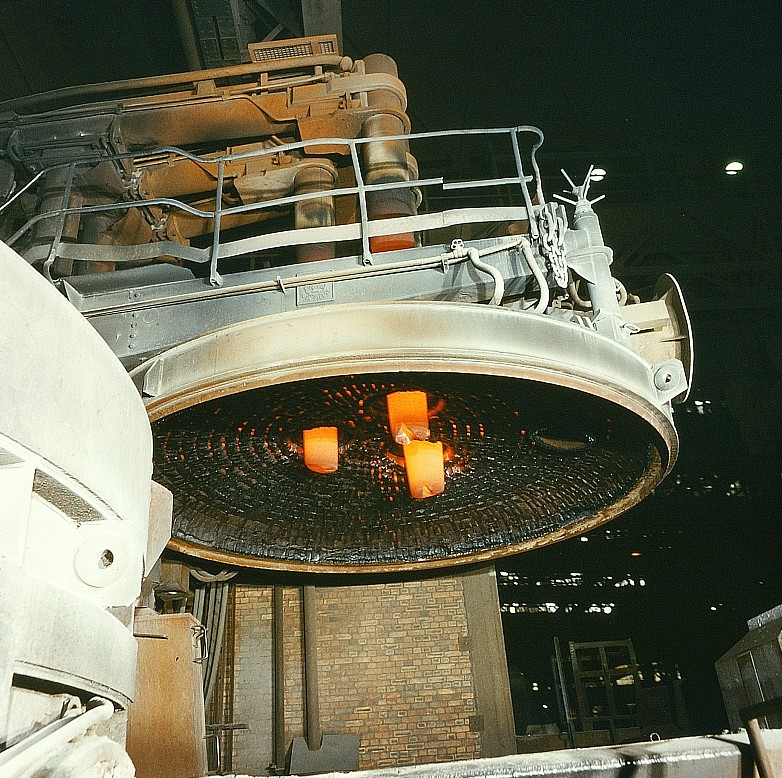
The roof of an arc furnace removed, showing the three electrodes

A typical alternating current furnace is powered by a three-phase electrical supply, and therefore has three electrodes. Electrodes are round in section, and typically in segments with threaded couplings, so that as the electrodes wear, new segments can be added. The arc forms between the charged material and the electrode; the charge is heated both by current passing through the charge and by the radiant energy evolved by the arc. The electric arc temperature reaches around 3,000 °C (5,400 °F), thus causing the lower sections of the electrodes to glow incandescently when in operation. The electrodes are automatically raised and lowered by a positioning system, which may use either electric winch hoists or hydraulic cylinders. The regulating system maintains approximately constant current and power input during the melting of the charge, even though scrap may move under the electrodes as it melts. The mast arms holding the electrodes can either carry heavy busbars (which may be hollow water-cooled copper pipes carrying current to the electrode clamps) or be "hot arms", where the whole arm carries the current, increasing efficiency. Hot arms can be made from copper-clad steel or aluminium. Large water-cooled cables connect the bus tubes or arms with the transformer located adjacent to the furnace. The transformer is installed in a vault and is cooled by pump-circulated transformer oil, with the oil being cooled by water via heat exchangers.

The furnace is built on a tilting platform so that the liquid steel can be poured into another vessel for transport. The operation of tilting the furnace to pour molten steel is called "tapping". Originally, all steelmaking furnaces had a tapping spout closed with refractory that washed out when the furnace was tilted, but often modern furnaces have an eccentric bottom tap-hole (EBT) to reduce inclusion of nitrogen and slag in the liquid steel. These furnaces have a taphole that passes vertically through the hearth and shell, and is set off-centre in the narrow "nose" of the egg-shaped hearth. It is filled with refractory sand, such as olivine, when it is closed off. Modern plants may have two shells with a single set of electrodes that can be transferred between the two; one shell preheats scrap while the other shell is utilised for meltdown. Other DC-based furnaces have a similar arrangement, but have electrodes for each shell and one set of electronics.

AC furnaces usually exhibit a pattern of hot and cold-spots around the hearth perimeter, with the cold-spots located between the electrodes. Modern furnaces mount oxygen-fuel burners in the sidewall and use them to provide chemical energy to the cold-spots, making the heating of the steel more uniform. Additional chemical energy is provided by injecting oxygen and carbon into the furnace; historically this was done through lances (hollow mild-steel tubes) in the slag door, but now this is mainly done through wall-mounted injection units that combine the oxygen-fuel burners and the oxygen or carbon injection systems into one unit.

A mid-sized modern steelmaking furnace would have a transformer rated about 60,000,000 volt-amperes (60 MVA), with a secondary voltage between 400 and 900 volts and a secondary current in excess of 44,000 amperes. In a modern shop such a furnace would be expected to produce a quantity of 80 tonnes of liquid steel in approximately 50 minutes from charging with cold scrap to tapping the furnace. In comparison, basic oxygen furnaces can have a capacity of 150–300 tonnes per batch, or "heat", and can produce a heat in 30–40 minutes. Enormous variations exist in furnace design details and operation, depending on the end product and local conditions, as well as ongoing research to improve furnace efficiency. The largest scrap-only furnace (in terms of tapping weight and transformer rating) is a DC furnace operated by Tokyo Steel in Japan, with a tap weight of 420 tonnes and fed by eight 32 MVA transformers for 256 MVA total power.

== Energy density ==
The production of a ton of steel in an electric arc furnace requires approximately 400 kilowatt-hours (1.44 gigajoules) per short ton, or about 440 kWh (1.6 GJ) per tonne. The theoretical minimum amount of energy required to melt a tonne of scrap steel is 300 kWh (1.09 GJ) (melting point 1,520 °C (2,768 °F)). Therefore, a 300-tonne, 300 MVA EAF will require approximately 132 MWh of energy to melt the steel, and a "power-on time" (the time that steel is being melted with an arc) of approximately 37 minutes.

Electric arc steelmaking is only economical where there is plentiful, reliable electricity, with a well-developed electrical grid. In many locations, mills operate during off-peak hours, when utilities have surplus power generating capacity and the price of electricity is less. This compares very favourably with energy consumption of global steel production by all methods estimated at some 5,555 kWh (20 GJ) per tonne (1 gigajoule is equal to approximately 278 kWh).

== Operation ==
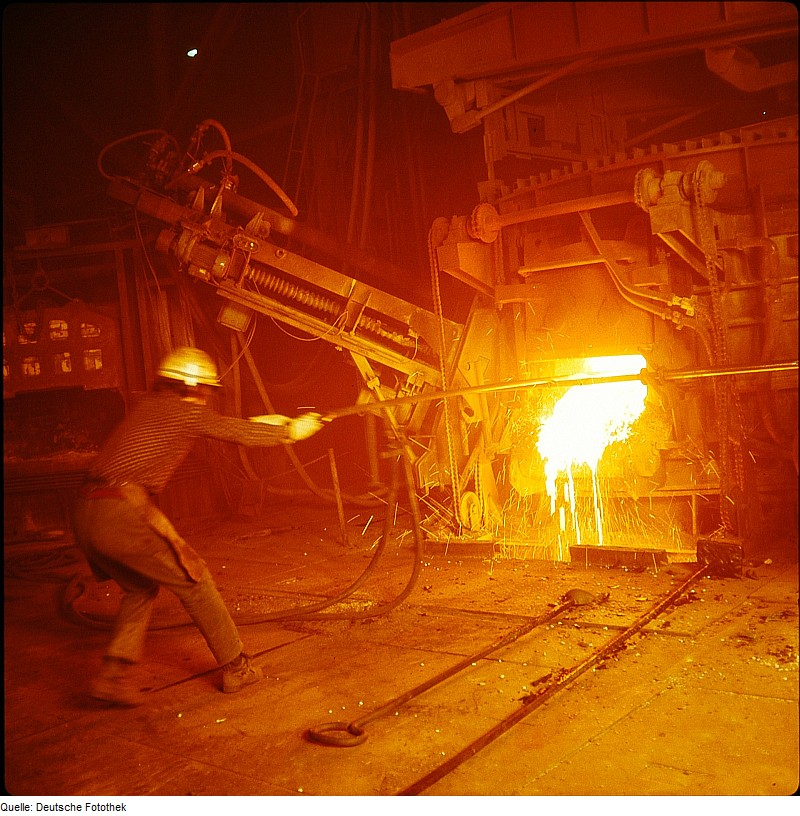
Foaming slag pours out the slag door of an EAF, while a worker checks the temperature using a long probe. Circa 1976

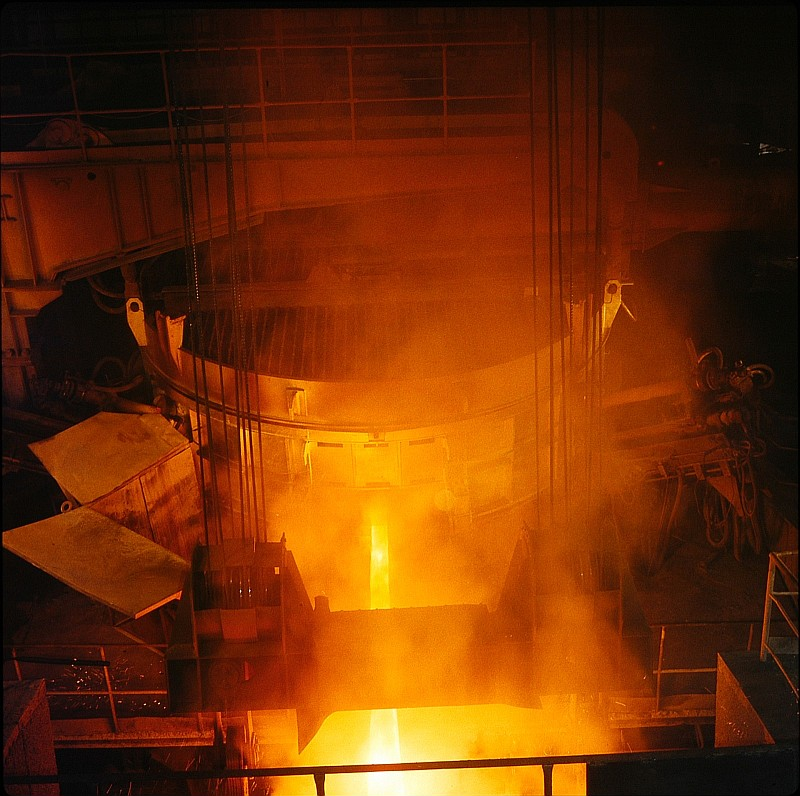
An EAF being tapped, circa 1980

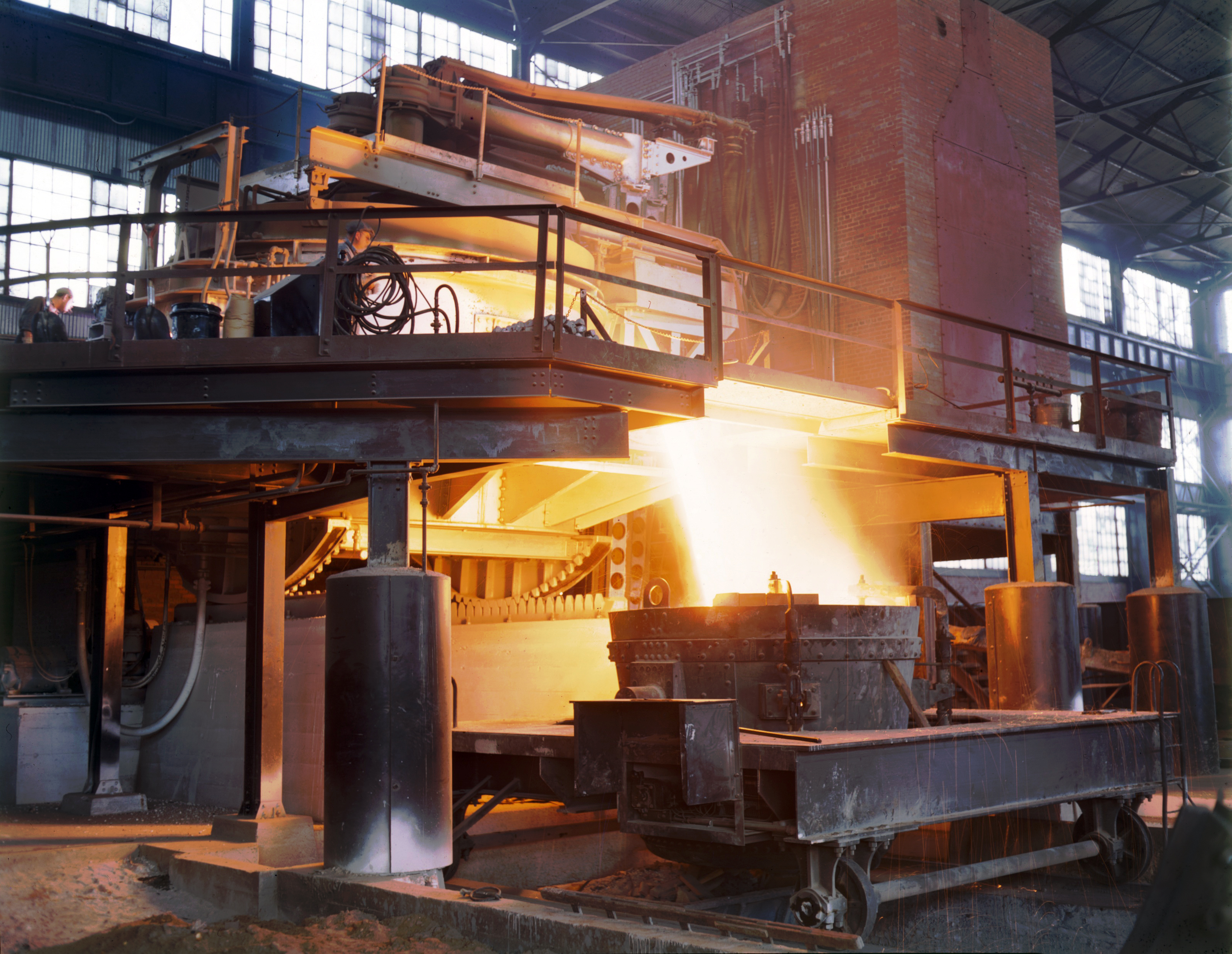
An arc furnace pouring out steel into a small ladle car. The transformer vault can be seen at the right side of the picture. For scale, note the operator standing on the platform at upper left. This is a 1941-era photograph and so does not have the extensive dust collection system that a modern installation would have, nor is the operator wearing a hard hat or dust mask.

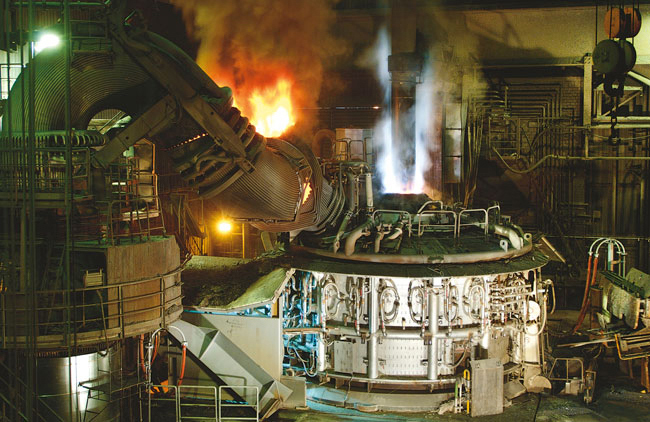
A DC arc furnace during power-on (note the single large electrode)

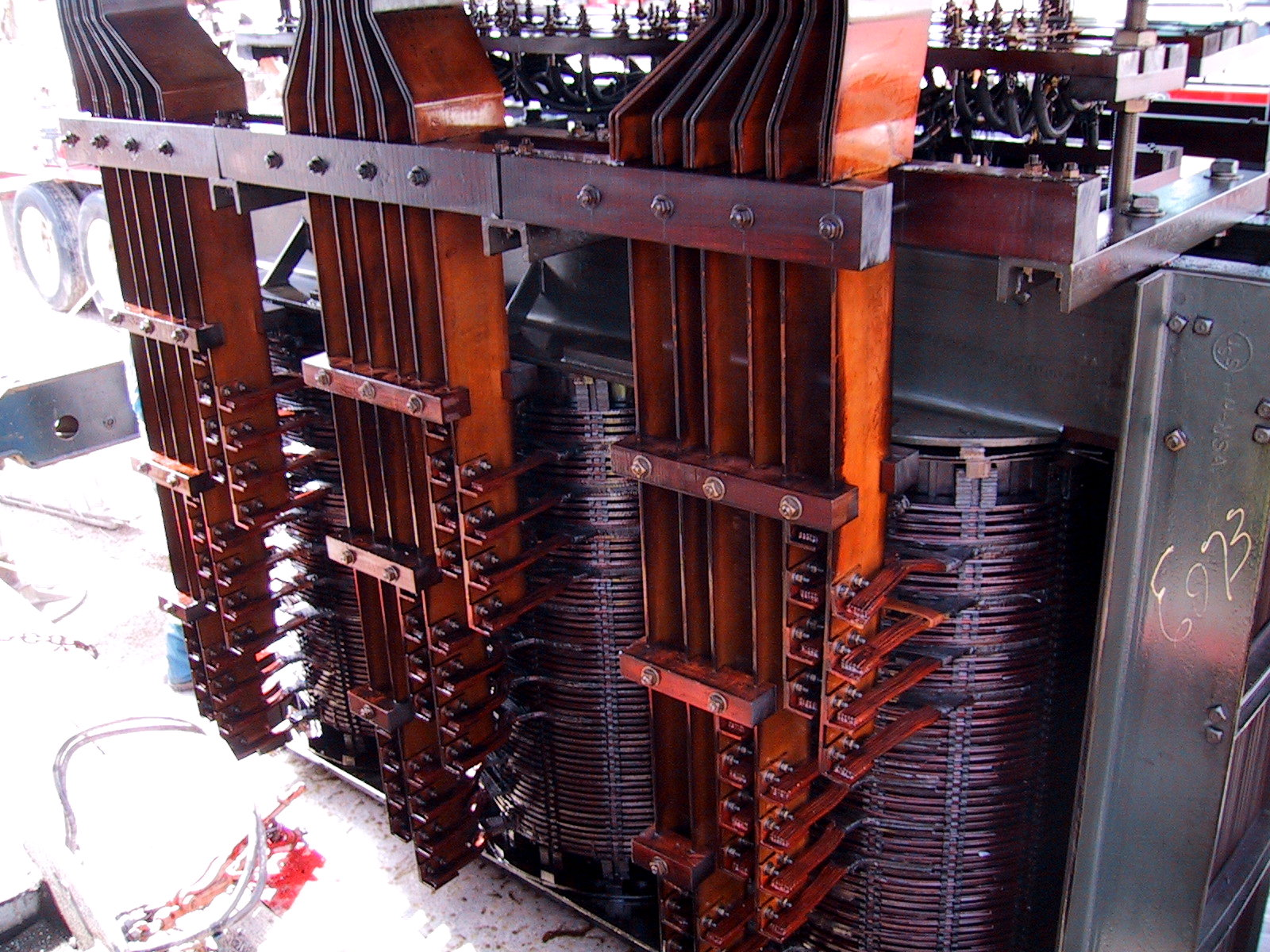
Power supply transformer and copper busbars for an arc furnace

Scrap metal is delivered to a scrap bay, located next to the melt shop. Scrap generally comes in two main grades: shred (whitegoods, cars and other objects made of similar light-gauge steel) and heavy melt (large slabs and beams), along with some direct reduced iron (DRI) or pig iron for chemical balance. Some furnaces melt almost 100% DRI.

The scrap is loaded into large buckets called baskets, with "clamshell" doors for a base. Care is taken to layer the scrap in the basket to ensure good furnace operation; heavy melt is placed on top of a light layer of protective shred, on top of which is placed more shred. These layers should be present in the furnace after charging. After loading, the basket may pass to a scrap pre-heater, which uses hot furnace off-gases to heat the scrap and recover energy, increasing plant efficiency.

The scrap basket is then taken to the melt shop, the roof is swung off the furnace, and the furnace is charged with scrap from the basket. Charging is one of the more dangerous operations for the EAF operators. A lot of potential energy is released by the tonnes of falling metal; any liquid metal in the furnace is often displaced upwards and outwards by the solid scrap, and the grease and dust on the scrap is ignited if the furnace is hot, resulting in a fireball erupting.

In some twin-shell furnaces, the scrap is charged into the second shell while the first is being melted down, and pre-heated with off-gas from the active shell. Other operations are continuous charging—pre-heating scrap on a conveyor belt, which then discharges the scrap into the furnace proper, or charging the scrap from a shaft set above the furnace, with off-gases directed through the shaft. Other furnaces can be charged with hot (molten) metal from other operations.

After charging, the roof is swung back over the furnace and meltdown commences. The electrodes are lowered onto the scrap, an arc is struck and the electrodes are then set to bore into the layer of shred at the top of the furnace. Lower voltages are selected for this first part of the operation to protect the roof and walls from excessive heat and damage from the arcs. Once the electrodes have reached the heavy melt at the base of the furnace and the arcs are shielded by the scrap, the voltage can be increased and the electrodes raised slightly, lengthening the arcs and increasing power to the melt. This enables a molten pool to form more rapidly, reducing tap-to-tap times. Oxygen is blown into the scrap, combusting or cutting the steel, and extra chemical heat is provided by wall-mounted oxygen-fuel burners. Both processes accelerate scrap meltdown. Supersonic nozzles enable oxygen jets to penetrate foaming slag and reach the liquid bath.

An important part of steelmaking is the formation of slag, which floats on the surface of the molten steel. Slag usually consists of metal oxides, and acts as a destination for oxidised impurities, as a thermal blanket (stopping excessive heat loss) and helping to reduce erosion of the refractory lining. For a furnace with basic refractories, which includes most carbon steel-producing furnaces, the usual slag formers are calcium oxide (CaO, in the form of burnt lime) and magnesium oxide (MgO, in the form of dolomite and magnesite).

These slag formers are either charged with the scrap, or blown into the furnace during meltdown. Another major component of EAF slag is iron oxide from steel combusting with the injected oxygen. Later in the heat, carbon (in the form of coke or coal) is injected into this slag layer, reacting with the iron oxide to form metallic iron and carbon monoxide gas, which then causes the slag to foam, allowing greater thermal efficiency, and better arc stability and electrical efficiency. The slag blanket also covers the arcs, preventing damage to the furnace roof and sidewalls from radiant heat.

Once the initial scrap charge has been melted down, another bucket of scrap can be charged into the furnace, although EAF development is moving towards single-charge designs. The scrap-charging and meltdown process can be repeated as many times as necessary to reach the required heat weight – the number of charges is dependent on the density of scrap; lower-density scrap means more charges. After all scrap charges have completely melted, refining operations take place to check and correct the steel chemistry and superheat the melt above its freezing temperature in preparation for tapping.

More slag formers are introduced and more oxygen is blown into the bath, burning out impurities such as silicon, sulfur, phosphorus, aluminium, manganese, and calcium, and removing their oxides to the slag. Removal of carbon takes place after these elements have burnt out first, as they have a greater affinity for oxygen. Metals that have a poorer affinity for oxygen than iron, such as nickel and copper, cannot be removed through oxidation and must be controlled through scrap chemistry alone, such as introducing the direct reduced iron and pig iron mentioned earlier.

A foaming slag is maintained throughout, and often overflows the furnace to pour out of the slag door into the slag pit. Temperature sampling and chemical sampling take place via automatic lances. Oxygen and carbon can be automatically measured via special probes that dip into the steel, but for all other elements, a "chill" sample — a small, solidified sample of the steel — is analysed on an arc-emission spectrometer.

Once the temperature and chemistry are correct, the steel is tapped out into a preheated ladle through tilting the furnace. For plain-carbon steel furnaces, as soon as slag is detected during tapping the furnace is rapidly tilted back towards the deslagging side, minimising slag carryover into the ladle. For some special steel grades, including stainless steel, the slag is poured into the ladle as well, to be treated at the ladle furnace to recover valuable alloying elements. During tapping some alloy additions are introduced into the metal stream, and more fluxes such as lime are added on top of the ladle to begin building a new slag layer.

Often, a few tonnes of liquid steel and slag is left in the furnace in order to form a "hot heel", which helps preheat the next charge of scrap and accelerate its meltdown. During and after tapping, the furnace is "turned around": the slag door is cleaned of solidified slag, the visible refractories are inspected and water-cooled components checked for leaks, and electrodes are inspected for damage or lengthened through the addition of new segments. The taphole is filled with sand at the completion of tapping. For a 90-tonne, medium-power furnace, the whole process will usually take about 60–70 minutes from the tapping of one heat to the tapping of the next (the tap-to-tap time).

The furnace is completely emptied of steel and slag on a regular basis so that an inspection of the refractories can be made and larger repairs made if necessary. As the refractories are often made from calcined carbonates, they are extremely susceptible to hydration from water, so any suspected leaks from water-cooled components are treated extremely seriously, beyond the immediate concern of potential steam explosions. Excessive refractory wear can lead to breakouts, where the liquid metal and slag penetrate the refractory and furnace shell and escape into the surrounding areas.

== Advantages for steelmaking ==
The use of EAFs allows steel to be made from a 100% scrap metal feedstock. This greatly reduces the energy required to make steel when compared with primary steelmaking from ores.

Another benefit is flexibility: while blast furnaces cannot vary their production by much and can remain in operation for years at a time, EAFs can be rapidly started and stopped, allowing the steel mill to vary production according to demand.

Although steelmaking arc furnaces generally use scrap steel as their primary feedstock, if hot metal from a blast furnace or direct-reduced iron is available economically, these can also be used as furnace feed.

As EAFs require large amounts of electrical power, many companies schedule their operations to take advantage of off-peak electricity pricing.

A typical steelmaking arc furnace is the source of steel for a mini-mill, which may make bars or strip product. Mini-mills can be sited relatively near the markets for steel products, so the transport requirements are less than for an integrated mill, which would commonly be sited near a harbor for better access to shipping.

Depending on the proportions of steel scrap, DRI and pig iron used, electric arc furnace steelmaking can result in carbon dioxide emissions as low as 0.6 tons CO_{2} per ton of steel produced, which is significantly lower than the conventional production route via blast furnaces and the basic oxygen furnace, which produces 2.9 tons CO_{2} per ton of steel produced.

== Issues ==
Although the modern electric arc furnace is a highly efficient recycler of steel scrap, operation of an arc furnace shop can have adverse environmental effects. Much of the capital cost of a new installation will be devoted to systems intended to reduce these effects, which include:

- Enclosures to reduce high sound levels
- Dust collector for furnace off-gas
- slag production
- cooling water demand
- Heavy truck traffic for scrap, materials handling, and product
- Environmental effects of electricity generation

Since EAF steelmaking mainly use recycled materials like scrap iron and scrap steel, as their composition varies the resulting EAF slag and EAF dust can be toxic. EAF dust is collected by air pollution control equipment. It is called collected dust and usually contains heavy metals, such as zinc, lead and dioxins, etc. It is categorized as hazardous industrial waste and disposal is regulated.

Because of the very dynamic quality of the arc furnace load, power systems may require technical measures to maintain the quality of power for other customers; flicker and harmonic distortion are common power system side-effects of arc furnace operation.

== Other electric arc furnaces ==
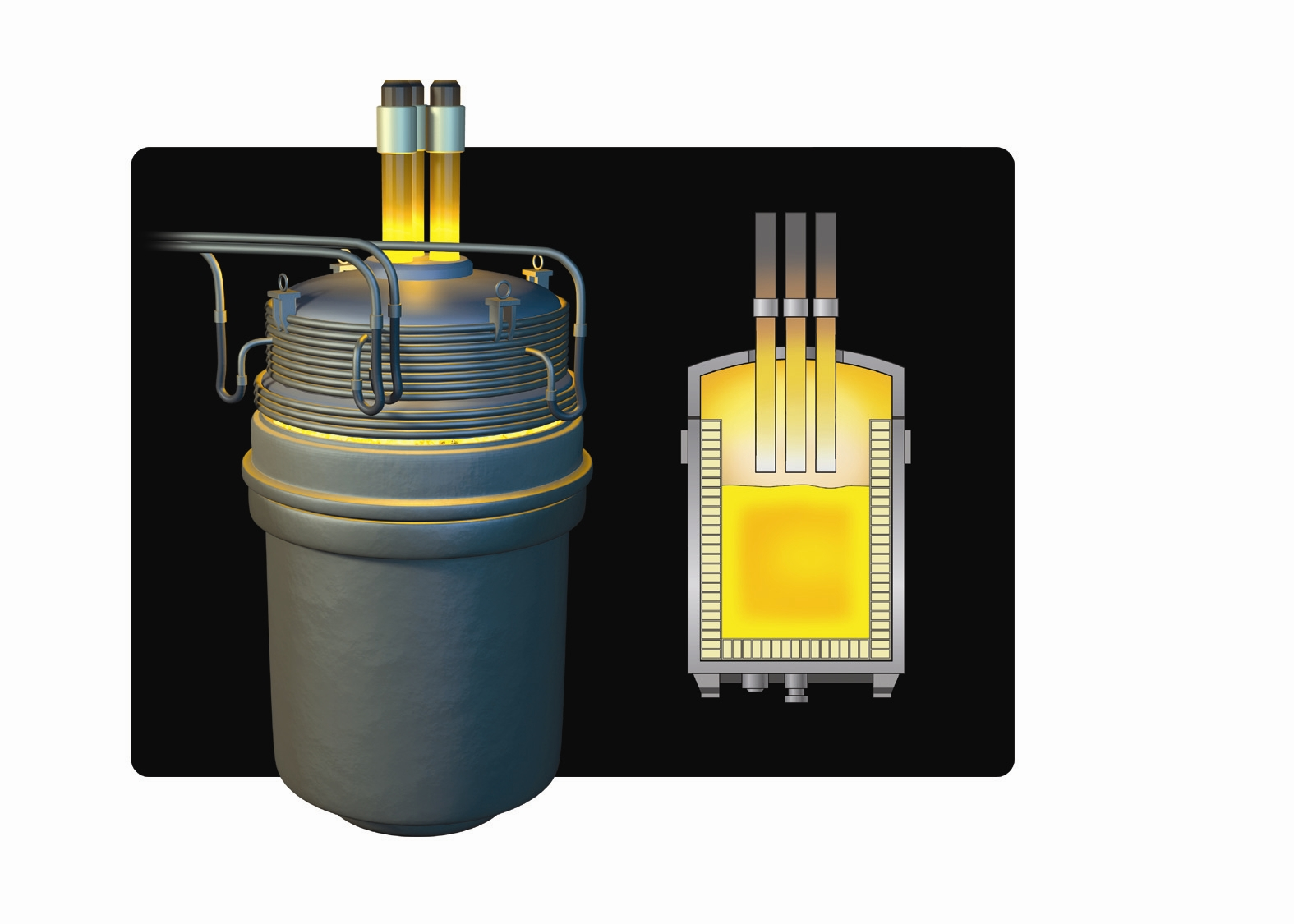
Rendering of a ladle furnace, a variation of the electric arc furnace used for keeping molten steel hot

For steelmaking, direct current (DC) arc furnaces are used, with a single electrode in the roof and the current return through a conductive bottom lining or conductive pins in the base. The advantage of DC is lower electrode consumption per ton of steel produced, since only one electrode is used, as well as less electrical harmonics and other similar problems. The size of DC arc furnaces is limited by the current carrying capacity of available electrodes, and the maximum allowable voltage. Maintenance of the conductive furnace hearth is a bottleneck in extended operation of a DC arc furnace.

In a steel plant, a ladle furnace (LF) is used to maintain the temperature of liquid steel during processing after tapping from EAF or to change the alloy composition. The ladle is used for the first purpose when there is a delay later in the steelmaking process. The ladle furnace consists of a refractory roof, a heating system, and, when applicable, a provision for injecting argon gas into the bottom of the melt for stirring. Unlike a scrap melting furnace, a ladle furnace does not have a tilting or scrap-charging mechanism.

Electric arc furnaces are also used for production of calcium carbide, ferroalloys, and other non-ferrous alloys, and for production of phosphorus. Furnaces for these services are physically different from steel-making furnaces and may operate on a continuous, rather than batch, basis. Continuous-process furnaces may also use paste-type, Søderberg electrodes to prevent interruptions from electrode changes.

Such a furnace is known as a submerged arc furnace, because the electrode tips are buried in the slag/charge, and arcing occurs through the slag, between the matte and the electrode. The casing and casing fins of the electrode melt the electrode paste through electrical current passing through the electrode casing and heat from the furnace. A steelmaking arc furnace, by comparison, arcs in the open. The key is the electrical resistance, which is what generates the heat required: the resistance in a steelmaking furnace is the atmosphere, while in a submerged-arc furnace, the slag (or charge) supplies the resistance. The liquid metal formed in either furnace is too conductive to form an effective heat-generating resistance.

== Cooling methods ==
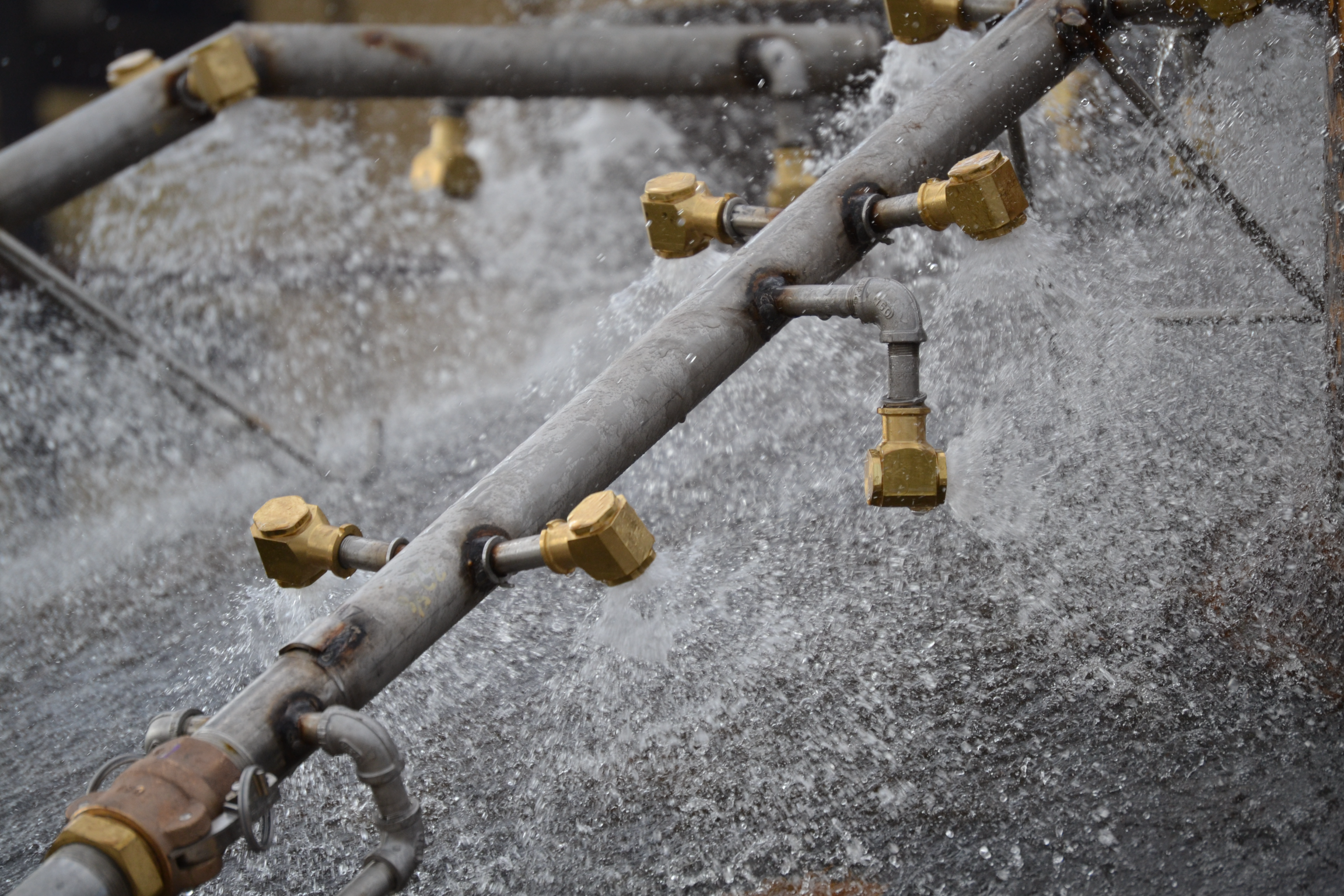
A non-pressurized cooling system

Smaller arc furnaces may be adequately cooled by circulation of air over structural elements of the shell and roof, but larger installations require intensive forced cooling to maintain the structure within safe operating limits. The furnace shell and roof may be cooled either by water circulated through pipes which form a panel, or by water sprayed on the panel elements. Tubular panels may be replaced when they become cracked or reach their thermal stress life cycle.

Spray cooling is the most economical and is the highest efficiency cooling method. A spray cooling piece of equipment can be relined almost endlessly. Equipment that lasts 20 years is the norm. While a tubular leak is immediately noticed in an operating furnace due to the pressure loss alarms on the panels, at this time there exists no immediate way of detecting a very small volume spray cooling leak. These typically hide behind slag coverage and can hydrate the refractory in the hearth, leading to a break out of molten metal or in the worst case a steam explosion.

== Plasma arc furnace ==
A plasma arc furnace (PAF) uses plasma torches instead of graphite electrodes. Each of these torches has a casing with a nozzle and axial tubing for feeding a plasma-forming gas (either nitrogen or argon) and a burnable cylindrical graphite electrode within the tubing. Such furnaces can be called plasma arc melt (PAM) furnaces; they are used extensively in the titanium-melting industry and similar specialty metal industries.

== Vacuum arc remelting ==
Vacuum arc remelting (VAR) is a secondary remelting process for vacuum refining and manufacturing of ingots with improved chemical and mechanical homogeneity.

In critical military and commercial aerospace applications, material engineers commonly specify VIM-VAR steels. VIM means vacuum induction melted and VAR means vacuum arc remelted. VIM-VAR steels become bearings for jet engines, rotor shafts for military helicopters, flap actuators for fighter jets, gears in jet or helicopter transmissions, mounts or fasteners for jet engines, jet tail hooks and other demanding applications.

Most grades of steel are melted once and are then cast or teemed into a solid form prior to extensive forging or rolling to a metallurgically-sound form. In contrast, VIM-VAR steels go through two more highly purifying melts under vacuum. After melting in an electric arc furnace and alloying in an argon oxygen decarburization vessel, steels destined for vacuum remelting are cast into ingot molds. The solidified ingots then head for a vacuum induction melting furnace. This vacuum remelting process rids the steel of inclusions and unwanted gases while optimizing the chemical composition.

The VIM operation returns these solid ingots to the molten state in the contaminant-free void of a vacuum. This tightly controlled melt often requires up to 24 hours. Still enveloped by the vacuum, the hot metal flows from the VIM furnace crucible into giant electrode molds. A typical electrode is about 15 feet (5 m) tall and will be in various diameters. The electrodes solidify under vacuum.

For VIM-VAR steels, the surface of the cooled electrodes must be ground to remove surface irregularities and impurities before the next vacuum remelt. Then the ground electrode is placed in a VAR furnace. In a VAR furnace, the steel gradually melts drop-by-drop in the vacuum-sealed chamber. Vacuum arc remelting further removes lingering inclusions to provide superior steel cleanliness and remove gases like oxygen, nitrogen and hydrogen. Controlling the rate at which these droplets form and solidify ensures a consistency of chemistry and microstructure throughout the entire VIM-VAR ingot, making the steel more resistant to fracture or fatigue. This refinement process is essential to meet the performance characteristics of parts like a helicopter rotor shaft, a flap actuator on a military jet, or a bearing in a jet engine.

For some commercial or military applications, steel alloys may go through only one vacuum remelt, namely the VAR. For example, steels for solid rocket cases, landing gears, or torsion bars for fighting vehicles typically involve one vacuum remelt.

Vacuum arc remelting is also used in production of titanium and other metals which are reactive or in which high purity is required.

== See also ==
- Flodin process
- Vacuum arc remelting
- Electrical steel
