= Ilfracombe Iron Company =

Australian mining and smelting company

Coordinates: 41°14′33.3″S 146°47′24.0″E

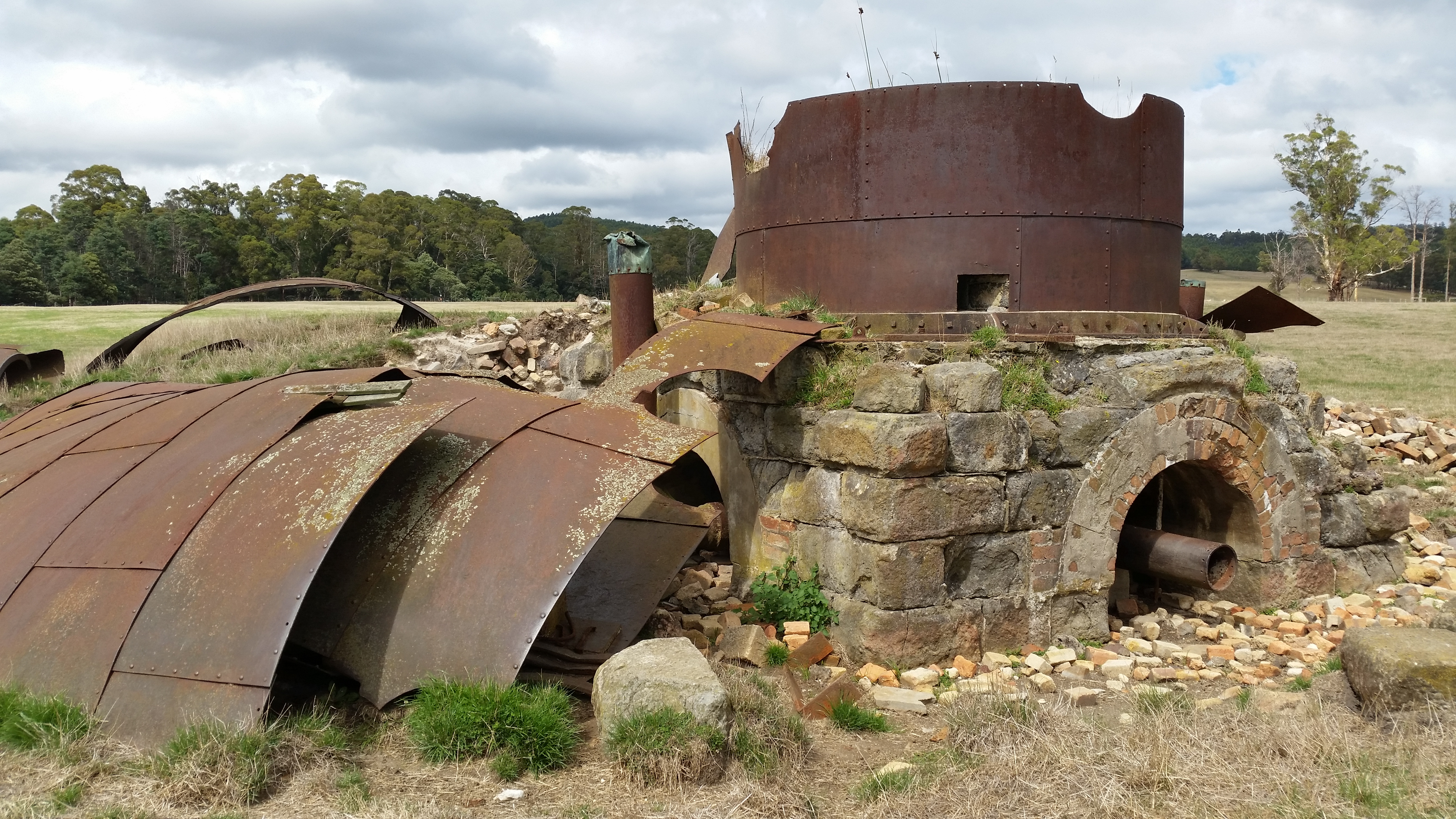
Ruin of Ilfracombe Iron Company's blast furnace (February 2018)

The Ilfracombe Iron Company (I.I.C.) was an iron mining and smelting company that operated in Northern Tasmania in 1873 and 1874. The company's operations included a blast furnace, ore mine, water wheel, village, and jetty. The I.I.C. rebuilt a disused timber-haulage tramway, terminating at Ilfracombe—now the southern part of modern-day Beauty Point—which it extended to reach its iron ore mine and terminated at its jetty at Beauty Point Ilfracombe previously built by the Ilfracombe saw mill and railway company of 1856. The ruin of its blast furnace is significant, as one of the only three such ruins of 19th-Century iron-smelting blast furnaces in Australia and the only one in Tasmania. It is the only remaining ruin—in Australia—of a 19th-Century blast furnace that had an iron shell.

Iron ore from the company's mine was smelted at a foundry in Melbourne in 1873. Two bells were cast from this iron; the smaller one was exhibited at the Victorian Exhibition (1872–73) in Melbourne and the larger bell at the Vienna Exposition of 1873.

The company constructed a blast furnace alongside a tributary of Middle Arm Creek. It originally intended to power the blast machinery from a large water wheel, which was erected but not used. Despite several design iterations, the steam-powered blast machinery was severely under-sized. Before this situation could be rectified, by raising more capital, the Oriental Bank foreclosed. The assets were sold cheaply; possibly, the new owner intended to restart operations. However, a large fall in the price of iron seems to have ended that possibility.

It remains questionable that the blast furnace actually produced any pig iron, although the company announced in an ambiguous telegram that it had.

== Historical context ==
Soon after the first settlement in Northern Tasmania, at York Town in 1804, colonial settlers found that there were extensive deposits of iron ore in the hills to the west of the Tamar estuary. Interest in the area was aroused again by the report in 1866 of the Government Geologist, Charles Gould.

There was an increase in pig-iron prices in the early 1870s, which led to the formation of a number of colonial era iron-making ventures in Australia. The price of imported pig-iron increased, from £4 10s per ton in 1870 to £9 per ton in 1873 greatly advantaging locally manufactured iron. However, this high price did not last long, as iron-making capacity increased and pig-iron was once again imported cheaply as ballast in sailing ships returning from England to Australia.

The Ilfracombe Iron Company was one of four ventures that smelted iron from local iron ore, in Tasmania during the 1870s; the others were, the British and Tasmanian Charcoal Iron Company, the Tamar Hematite Iron Company—both nearby on the Tamar estuary—and the Derwent Iron Company. A fifth venture, the Swedish Charcoal Iron Company never went beyond issuing a prospectus. There were also three commercial iron-smelting operations in mainland Australia during the 1870s, the Fitzroy Iron Works, the Lal Lal Iron Company, and the Lithgow Valley Iron Works.

== Smelting materials ==
The ore deposit was the first of the deposits in the West Tamar area that were mentioned by Charles Gould in his report of 1866. It was located on private property at on a tributary of Middle Arm Creek, on the western flank of Peaked Hill, about 5 km south of the modern-day town of Beaconsfield. The company later located its smelting site adjacent to this deposit.

A sample, consisting of "hematite and brown ore", had the following analysis:

"Iron ......... 60.6 [%]

Silica ........ 2.4 [%]

Sulphur and phosphorus, though carefully sought for were not detected."

Limestone was obtained from deposits nearby. The fuel used was charcoal, burnt from local timber.

== History of operations ==
=== Foundation of the company ===
The force behind the new company was Captain Duncan Longden. The other major shareholders were Ayde Douglas (a Tasmanian lawyer and politician, who was also an owner of a previous, then dormant timber venture in the same area), James Major (of the Melbourne engineering firm Doyne, Major and Willet), James Bickerton, John Robb, David Spence, and two others.

The company was at work for some time before it was officially registered. During this period, it was mainly Longden and Major who were active. The two secured a 3,000 acre leasehold in 1872.

The Ilfracombe Iron Company was registered on 28 January 1873. It had an authorised capital of £50,000 in 10,000 £5 shares. 2000 of the shares were issued as fully paid, probably in exchange for properties, assets and services that the new company needed. The remaining shares were partly paid, to £4.

=== Trial smelting and exhibition castings ===
Before the Ilfracombe Iron Company was even registered, it had sent iron ore to Melbourne for a trial smelting, at the Railway Foundry, owned by Drysdale and Fraser. In November 1872, the iron ore was smelted with coke and limestone in a furnace—probably a cupola furnace—and various castings were made, including two bells, seven 'pigs' weighing 2-stone (12.7 kg) and one pig weighing 3-hundredweight (152 kg), and "half-a-dozen 18lb. [8.2 kg] cannon balls". It seems that a total of around 400 kg of iron was made, the first time that Tasmanian iron ore had been smelted in a significant quantity in Australia.

The smaller bell—weighing about 9 kg—was exhibited at the Victorian Exposition of 1872-1873. The larger bell—about 2 feet high, 18 inches wide at mouth, and weighing 210 lbs (95 kg)—was exhibited at the Vienna Exposition of 1873, where it was inspected in September 1873 by Emperor Franz Joseph. It had the coat of arms of Melbourne on one side and, along the rim on the other side, the words "Ilfracombe Iron Company". The ability to cast bells directly from the pig-iron demonstrated its quality.

=== Construction ===
The on-site manager was a civil engineer, Benjamin Hawkins Dodds, who had experience in the Scottish iron industry. The construction of the furnace was the responsibility of a Swedish furnaceman, Karl Haine, with the advice of James Baird Thorneycroft from Scotland.

The foundation stone of the furnace was laid on 12 May 1873, by David Spence, a Melbourne merchant, who was a shareholder. Progress was rapid, with a visitor to the site, in September 1873, reporting extensive progress, with about 100 men working at the site and the work nearly completed.

=== Delays ===
A fire was lit in the furnace in August 1873 and maintained thereafter, to dry out the furnace to be ready for production. The company prepared a pattern to cast plaques to commemorate what it planned as its first casting of pig-iron in "October 1873". The pattern still survives—held by the Queen Victoria Museum and Art Gallery in Launceston—but the casting in October never occurred.

In early November 1873, it emerged that the iron could not be run because the steam engine used to drive the blast machinery was too small. Another larger engine was on its way from Melbourne, which would be used, "till the water wheel is ready to perform the work, and will then standby to be used in time of emergency, should such arise".

=== Announcements of success and subsequent closure ===
On 24 November 1873, a small article appeared in the Melbourne newspaper The Argus. It read, " WITH reference to iron mining in Tasmania, the Launceston Examiner reports :—' A quantity of iron has been run off most successfully at the works of the Ilfracombe Iron Company. The furnace answered admirably. The company begins work with unexceptional [sic] prospects.' " There seems to have been nothing corresponding to it, in the local press in Northern Tasmania.This would be the beginnings of the mystery surrounding the first iron production of Ilfracombe Iron Company.

A few days later, a telegram received from the manager of the I.I.C. read, "George Town, Nov. 28 Twelve pigs Ilfracombe iron shipped per Tamar. Everything progressing well." A local newspaper, the Launceston Examiner, expanded on this announcement by adding, "We believe the weight of the above is about two tons, and that the furnace was tapped on Thursday afternoon, a telegram having been sent to Mr Major that evening, asking him to arrange for shipping it by the Tamar, on her outward trip yesterday." This seemed to be incompatible with the earlier announcement in Melbourne on 24 November 1873, and appears to be the first time that success was announced in Tasmania.

Arrangements had been made to load the pigs onto the steamer Tamar, as she passed down the Tamar River from Launceston, en-route to Melbourne, on 28 November 1873. Presumably, that was done by loading the pigs at the Ilfracombe Company's jetty. It seems that James Major accompanied the pigs to Melbourne, arriving on 29 November 1873, perhaps intending show off the iron to Victorian shareholders and others.

It was soon apparent that the furnace had not stayed in service, as would be usual once production of iron had commenced.

An optimistic report appeared, on 20 December 1873, stating that production had recommenced. It was reported—presumably based on a communication with the company—that, "The new vertical iron cylinders at the Ilfracombe Iron Company's works have been completed, and found to answer admirably. The necessary repairs to the furnace have been carried out, and fire-bricks of the proper description substituted for the inferior ones which were at first unwittingly put in, and active operations were commenced last Tuesday" [16 December 1874].

However, on the same day as that report of production commencing, 20 December 1873, a prominent shareholder, Ayde Douglas, was on his way to the site to meet Major and Longden and find out for himself what was happening.

Another attempt at smelting took place on 23 December 1873, using still larger blast cylinders made of wood at the site, after which the furnace was never relit.

=== Demise and sale of assets ===
The company had exhausted its capital, wasting some of it on assets that it never put to use, such as its waterwheel. After the failure of attempts to smelt on 16 and 23 December 1873, it became apparent that a larger blast engine and larger blowing cylinders were necessary and would require more capital. The company also had a debt to the Oriental Bank.

It was decided to create a new company of larger capital, and issue new shares to existing shareholders in exchange for the old company's assets. This suited Longden and Major, who were unable to participate in any other kind of restructure, as both had run out of money by this time. However, the Oriental Bank took legal action to prevent the new company being formed and to secure repayment of its loan. An order went to the sheriff to sell off the assets.

There was no auction but the assets were sold to Ayde Douglas for £805, roughly the amount owed to the bank. Douglas had secured the assets cheaply, but the other shareholders' interests were wiped out. The waterwheel was sold off and ended up powering a stamper battery at the Leura Mine.

The low-key sale and the shunning of Major and Longden hints at conflict among the shareholders; it is likely that, as the people managing the site work and operations, Major and Longden were seen as responsible for the failure to enter production.

As the price of iron was still high at the time of the sale, Douglas probably intended to restart the works, but the iron price later collapsed. The furnace site was abandoned.

=== Controversy ===
The first hint that the Ilfracombe Iron Company may have been concealing something about the outcome of its iron smelting came in an editorial, by T.C.Just, in the newspaper the Cornwall Chronicle,(also reprinted as an article in the Tasmanian), in December 1874. It read, "It is just twelve months since we recorded the partial success of the Ilfracombe Iron Company, in smelting pig iron from the ore found on their property. We afterwards learnt, however, that this iron had not been fairly produced by any ordinary furnace process, and the subsequent collapse of the company showed this to be only too true. When attempts were made to produce the article in bulk from the large furnace, they utterly failed".

The announcement by telegram, on 28 November 1873, had merely said that, "Twelve pigs Ilfracombe iron shipped per Tamar"—making no mention of the furnace—but the obvious assumption was that the iron had come from the company's blast furnace. In any case, the day after the telegram, the pigs were on the sea en route for Melbourne; there was virtually no opportunity for locals to see the pigs before they disappeared from the district. And, unusually, the blast furnace did not remain in continuous production after its supposed first tapping.

If the twelve pigs (two tons) of iron despatched in November 1873 on the s.s. Tamar had not come from the furnace—since no other furnace was working nearby—the pigs would either be Ilfracombe iron smelted from its ore elsewhere—like the iron smelted in Melbourne in November 1872—or not Ilfracombe iron at all.

If the iron was from another source—even allowing for the relatively remote location of the blast furnace—it would have been an elaborate deception, necessitating the involvement of at least some of the company's staff and management. The unlikelihood of such a deception has led some historians to dismiss Just's editorial; one seeing it as a "political statement", by Just who was a shareholder in the rival British and Tasmanian Charcoal Iron Company.

However, four different experts—examining the furnace ruin in 1883, 1982, 1988, and 2012—failed to find any iron in the hearth of the old blast furnace. An unused cast iron tapping block from the furnace also survives; perhaps that block was a spare, but the absence of iron in the hearth is far harder to explain. It therefore seems possible that the ongoing problem with the furnace—a mismatch between the relatively small capacity of the blast machinery and the size of the furnace—was enough to prevent the furnace reaching a suitable temperature to smelt iron ore and produce molten pig-iron. If so, the well-made furnace could never have produced any iron.

Against this conclusion there is but one piece of physical evidence; an archaeological research map of the blast furnace site shows a 'bosh skull' located nearby to the furnace ruin. A bosh skull is a mass of solidified iron and slag. If it exists at the remote site, the bosh skull could only have come from the furnace. However, even this does not prove conclusively that the furnace made molten pig iron that was successfully tapped, on 27 November 1873. All that is known for certain is that the second and third attempts to smelt iron—on 16 and 23 December 1873—both failed. These were the last attempts made, because the company afterwards ran out of money.

It seems that the telegram announcement of 28 November 1873 was, most probably, part of a deliberate attempt to mislead—designed to help attract the additional capital that the company so desperately needed—as was the subsequent report of production recommencing in December 1873.

== Technology ==
=== Process and equipment ===
==== Blast furnace ====
The furnace was an open-top, cold-blast furnace. It was described, in an article in the Launceston Examiner of 20 September 1873, as follows, "The foundation of the furnace is laid in concrete 4 feet deep, on the top of this is 6 feet 6 in. of solid substantial masonry. The masonry consists of four grand arches in the form of a cross, thus constituting a compact block 14 feet square the arches being used instead of building the block quite solid, in order to lessen the chances of the damp ascending into the body of the furnace. On the top of this masonry a large boiler plate cylinder 10 feet in diameter is erected, with a strong heavy cast iron ring at the base, from which through the masonry into the foundation holding down bolts are passed and fastened, thus firmly securing the upright cylinder." The iron shell was lined with firebricks.

The furnace had provision for conversion to recycle the off-gases to heat the blast, although no stoves to heat the blast were ever built. This suggests another probable reason for its failure; a furnace and blower possibly sized for hot-blast operation, but used as a cold-blast furnace.

A casting shed 95 feet long by 30 feet wide, with a wooden shingled roof was constructed; it was expected that casting of pig iron would occur every 12-hours.

==== Blast machinery ====
The blowing cylinders were made by Messrs Robertson Bros. of Melbourne. The equipment was described, in an article in the Launceston Examiner of 20 September 1873, as follows, "double cylinders 15 inches in diameter, 24 inches stroke, having a minimum velocity of 60 strokes per minute, and discharge the air into a large wrought iron receiver, capable of contaiting 128 cubic feet, and thence. through the tuyeres into the furnace".

The original plan was for this blast machinery would be powered by a waterwheel but in fact all actual operation of the furnace used steam power. It was powered first by a steam engine that had been hired for the purpose but proved too small. Later a larger engine was used, but it apparently it—or the blast cylinders themselves—was too small as well.

==== Dam and waterwheel ====
The plant was intended to make use of water power. A dam was constructed across Snowey's Creek, a perennial stream. The dam was about half a mile from the furnace and had a 50-foot wall. The water passed through a channel and into a flume with a fall of 97 feet. About halfway along the flume, a smaller horizontal waterwheel powered a sawmill, with the water continuing in the remaining part of the flume to the main waterwheel. After the waterwheel, the water ran through an underground passage to flow into the creek.

The waterwheel stood 120 feet from the furnace. It was 30 feet in diameter and 4 feet wide, with 64 buckets and heavy cast-iron bosses 3 feet in diameter through which the shaft passed. This large waterwheel apparently was never used by the Ilfracombe Iron Co. but was later used to power a gold mine stamper battery.

==== Charcoal kilns ====
There were two charcoal kilns, halfway between the dam and the furnace, each 200 feet long by 20 feet wide. The walls and roof were of sod, with cast-iron portholes along the sides to maintain the necessary restricted air flow for the charcoal-burning process.

=== Transport ===
==== Tramway ====
There was a disused timber tramway for the former Ilfracombe saw-mill, which conveniently ran alongside the iron ore deposit. It had been laid down in 1857 and become overgrown and rotten by the 1870s, so the track needed total reconstruction. At the river end, it needed extension to the north to the site of the new jetty.

The new tramway was horse-drawn and had wooden rails of 3-inch × 2-inch timber set at 3-foot gauge.

==== Jetty ====
The original jetty that was the terminus of the timber-haulage tramway was further south from where the I. I. C. built its new jetty. The choice of the site of the new jetty was a good one, as the new jetty could—with some extension—reach water 30 feet deep, enough to accommodate a 500 ton ship.

The jetty was described as, "a substantial jetty, 133ft long by 15ft wide" and "built of stone and logs". The tramway ran over the length of the jetty and connected it to the smelter site.

== Legacy and remnants ==
The ruin of the blast furnace lies on private property. It is only one of three 19th-Century blast furnace ruins in Australia, and the only one in Tasmania. It is the only such ruin with an iron outer-shell.

Approximately three metres of the lowest part of the blast furnace is still standing; the stone base and hearth—including the three tuyere ports and the three tuyere pipes—and the lowest part of the iron shell are in place. Lying on the ground, adjacent to the furnace, is the iron shell from the collapsed upper part of the furnace, which sheared off the furnace structure when a large tree fell on it. The fallen tree lay over the furnace in 1969 but is now gone. The area immediately adjacent to the furnace base is strewn with fire bricks. An unused cast iron tapping block from the old furnace survives and is on display at the Beaconsfield Mine & Heritage Centre.

The iron ore mining site is close by, as are the sites of the dam and the waterwheel, both of which can still be identified.

No trace exists of the Ilfracombe Iron Company's jetty on the Tamar River. Its former site is close to the Australian Maritime College's training facility at Beauty Point.

The pattern for plaques intended to commemorate the aborted casting of pig-iron in "October 1873" is in the Queen Victoria Museum & Art Gallery, in Launceston.

A replica of the iron bell that was shown at the Vienna Exposition of 1873 was cast in Tasmania in 2017; it is on display at the Beaconsfield Mine & Heritage Centre. On its rim, the bell has cast lettering reading "Ilfracombe Iron Company".

== See also ==
- British and Tasmanian Charcoal Iron Company
- Tamar Hematite Iron Company
- Lal Lal Iron Mine and Smelting Works - another 19th-Century blast furnace ruin in Victoria
- Bogolong iron mine and blast furnace - another 19th-Century blast furnace ruin in New South Wales
- List of 19th-century iron smelting operations in Australia
