= British and Tasmanian Charcoal Iron Company =

Iron mining and smelting company

Coordinates: 41°08′43.1″S 146°48′33.0″E

The British and Tasmanian Charcoal Iron Company (BTCIC) was an iron mining and smelting company that operated from 1874 to 1878 in Northern Tasmania, Australia. It was formed by floating the operations of a private company, the Tasmanian Charcoal Iron Company that operated between 1871 and 1874.

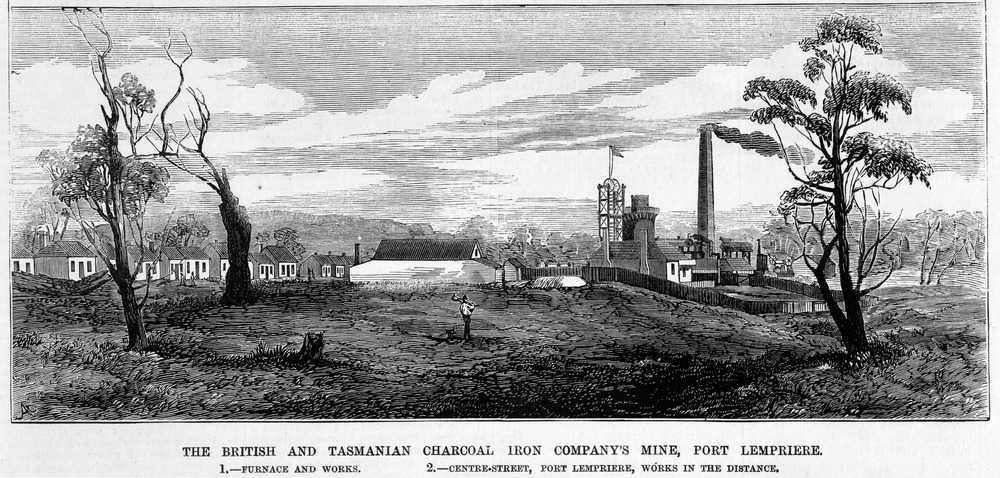
Centre Street, Port Lempriere (now part of Beauty Point, Tasmania), with the British and Tasmanian Charcoal Iron Company's blast furnace in the background. Unknown artist / engraver. State Library of Victoria. This view was made during or before December 1875.

This venture was the largest of the four that smelted iron from local iron ore in Tasmania during the 1870s. Despite its name, the company was mainly owned by shareholders from the colonies of Victoria and Tasmania, and it used coke rather than charcoal.

The company's operations included an iron ore mine near Anderson's Creek and a railway from the mine to its blast furnace and port near Redbill Point—now part of modern-day Beauty Point—on the West Arm of the Tamar River estuary in Northern Tasmania. Its blast furnace—the largest and most modern in Australia for its time—produced pig-iron June 1876 to August 1877.

Both well-capitalised and well-managed, the BTCIC used well-designed processes and equipment. However, the venture failed, mainly because the chromium content of its iron ore reached levels that resulted in pig-iron of an unsaleable quality. Consequently, planned expansion—such as steel-making—was never commenced.

After the BTCIC was wound up in 1878, the assets were sold to the 'Purchase Company'; the new company tried to overcome the problem of high chromium content, but it eventually broke up and sold the assets at auctions held in June 1883 and February 1885.

There is very little remaining now of this relatively large—for its time—mining and smelting operation. The two company towns, Port Lempriere (the port township and the site of the blast furnace) and Leonardsborough (near the mine site) no longer exist.

== Historical context ==
Soon after the first settlement in Northern Tasmania, at York Town in 1804, colonial settlers found that there were extensive deposits of iron ore in the hills to the west of the Tamar estuary. Interest in the area was aroused again by the report in 1866 of the Government Geologist, Charles Gould.

There was an increase in pig-iron prices in the early 1870s, which led to the formation of a number of colonial era iron-making ventures in Australia. The price of imported pig-iron increased, from £4 10s per ton in 1870 to £9 per ton in 1873 greatly advantaging locally manufactured iron. However, this high price did not last long, as iron-making capacity increased and pig-iron was once again imported cheaply as ballast in sailing ships returning from England to Australia.

By 1876–1877, pig iron was being made in both New South Wales—traditionally a 'free-trade' colony—and in Victoria, a 'protectionist' colony. Pig-iron production in Australia was to cease more or less completely after June 1884, when the Lal Lal furnace was extinguished—largely due to import competition—and did not resume until May 1907, when Australia's first modern blast furnace entered production at Lithgow.

The BTCIC was the largest of four ventures that smelted iron from local iron ore in Tasmania during the 1870s; the others were the Ilfracombe Iron Company, the Tamar Hematite Iron Company— both nearby on the Tamar estuary—and the Derwent Iron Company. A fifth venture, the Swedish Charcoal Iron Company never went beyond issuing a prospectus.

== Iron ore deposits ==
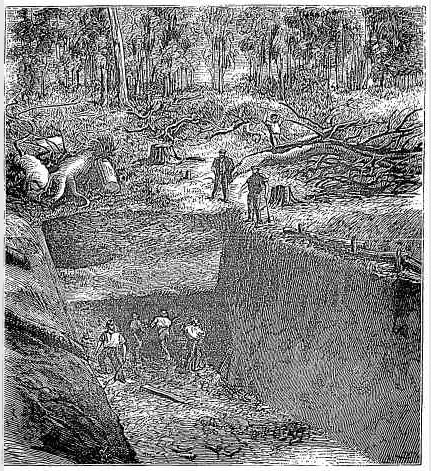
Iron ore mine at Mt. Vulcan in 1873 (Tasmanian Charcoal Iron Company). Unknown artist / engraver. Published in Illustrated Australian News for Home Readers Tue 9 Sep 1873 Page 156.

The iron ore deposits were two hills lying near on the western side of Anderson's Creek, subsequently called Mt. Vulcan and Scott's Hill. These both lay on Crown land. The iron ore had been discovered by Colonel William Paterson, soon after the first European settlement in Northern Tasmania at nearby York Town. The two hills had been singled out as potential mining sites, by Charles Gould in his report of 1866. The area between the hills was also covered in loose iron ore. Mt Vulcan would be the main source of the company's quarried iron ore.

=== Characteristics ===
==== Geology ====
The iron ore deposit consisted of hematite closest to the surface, with magnetite below that, over an underlying bed of serpentine. A deep bore encountered more magnetite below the serpentine and it seems that there were alternating bands of iron ore and serpentine. The hematite probably had formed from the weathering of the upper strata of magnetite.

==== Iron content ====
During the early 1870s, assaying of Mt Vulcan iron ore was carried out by eight separate analysts; two in Melbourne, five in England and one in Scotland. The iron content identified in the various assays ranged between 49.5% and 71.8%, with a cluster of results around 60%. Compared with contemporary English iron ore resources, the deposit was a rich one.

==== Chromium content ====
Only one of the eight analysts who had tested the ore in the early 1870s reported the presence of chromium, and then only as a trace. It seems that the weathered ore closest to the surface may have had a lower chromium content than the deeper ore removed during mining operations.

Later, after production of pig-iron had commenced, it was identified that much of the ore contained 2% to 6% chromium—in the form of the mineral chromite—but other samples had negligible levels.

== History of operations ==
=== Tasmanian Charcoal Iron Company (1871–1874) ===
In October 1867, under the pseudonym "E.H.", Enoch Hughes wrote the first of a series of letters to newspapers extolling Newcastle, N.S.W. as a location for an iron works, complete with estimates of production costs. A later letter written by Hughes on the same theme, in May 1872, influenced the formation of a private company, the Tasmanian Charcoal Iron Company, to mine and smelt iron ore in Northern Tasmania.

The two main proponents of the venture, two Tasmanians, James Reid Scott (a local politician) and Thomas Cook Just (a newspaper proprietor and entrepreneur), inspected the iron ore deposit during May 1871. They and three others then each took up adjacent leases of 80 acres—the maximum allowed to one party—together controlling 400 acres that included the ore deposit. Combining with "one or two leading commercial men in Melbourne, represented by Messrs. Lempriere—old Tasmanian residents", they formed the Tasmanian Charcoal Iron Company. The share capital was fixed at £80,000, in 40,000 shares of £2 each, every share being paid up to £1, with the remaining amount. being left at call.

==== Initial operations (1872–1873) ====
The company hired William Leonard as its manager during September 1872. A settlement nearby to the mine was named Leonardsborough in his honour. Mining operations commenced at Mt Vulcan during 1872, and the new mine was one of the first to use dynamite. By December 1872, a 310-foot-long (94 m) wharf had been constructed, 4¾ miles of timber-railed tramway had been laid, buildings erected at West Arm ('Port Lempriere') and Anderson's Creek ('Leonardsborough'), machinery was on order, 50,000 bricks were ready for the kiln, and construction had started on a smelting furnace.

The directors and Leonard were persuaded to adopt the smelting process of Dr William Henry Harrison of Melbourne. Harrison was in the process of patenting an iron smelting furnace, which he claimed reduced fuel consumption and had been proven in America. The furnace, to Harrison's design, was constructed at Leonardsborough. The corner stone of the new furnace—or possibly its chimney-stack—was laid on 6 December 1872, by the Governor, Charles Du Cane. The Governor did this using tools—a trowel and hammer made by blacksmith Peter Massey—smelted from the ore in a "small testing furnace" at Port Lempriere.

When the Harrison furnace was charged on 18 April 1873, the intense heat split the chimney apart. It seems that only a small quantity of iron was made before the damage occurred. This was probably enough to convince the company that the Harrison furnace was not a viable means to produce the large quantities of iron upon which the success of the venture depended. Some saw the Harrison furnace as a "complete failure", and contemporary reports mention a single bar of iron that had been produced in the furnace. Harrison defended his furnace publicly, stating in a letter, "Furnace success, although only half in work, the ore produces splendid iron at once, either malleable, white cast, or grey cast; all of qualities never approached by any samples I ever saw".

Just was later to state that the directors had been deceived about the capabilities of the Harrison furnace, and its failure probably cost William Leonard his position as manager.

==== Plans for expansion ====
The directors secured the services of Mr Robert Scott—previously manager of the Coltness Ironworks, near Glasgow, Scotland—to investigate and report on the prospects of the mine. Scott would also have been able to see for himself the damaged Harrison direct reduction furnace, and the iron that it had made.

Three bores were made at Mt Vulcan during 1873, to test the extent of the iron ore deposit and assays were made of the ore to determine its suitability

Scott reported favourably on the mine and, as a result, the directors resolved to erect four blast furnaces, a Bessemer steel plant, and rolling mills. Scott was then appointed General Manager of the concern—replacing William Leonard who went on to work for the rival Derwent Iron Company. Scott then left for England—accompanied by one of the companies attourneys—to order new equipment and arrange for it to be shipped to Tasmania.

Acting on Scott's advice, work at the mine site was suspended, apart from cutting timber for charcoal and proving up the size of the ore deposit. Although it was planned to continue what were, by then, being described as "the experiments with the Harrison furnace", the company clearly had changed its preferred approach to iron smelting. Scaffolding was erected to repair the Harrison furnace chimney in May 1873, but nothing much further appears to have been done to pursue the Harrison direct reduction path to iron-making. It is likely that the company had decided to follow a better-proven technology and—perhaps above all else—one that was capable of high-volume production of iron, and ultimately steel. Their decision to use blast furnace technology—rather than persist with Harrison's approach—also may have been influenced by the erection of a blast furnace for the rival Ilfracombe Iron Company around the same time, but it is also a fact that semi-solid sponge iron—such as produced by direct reduction—would not suit the new long-term plan to feed a Bessemer converter and make steel.

Harrison did not take these changes well and continued to defend his process, making the very unlikely claim—in a self-serving letter to the Government Geologist W.H. Twelvetrees in 1902—that his furnace had produced "a considerable quantity of high grade steel" during its brief operation.

=== British and Tasmanian Charcoal Iron Company (1875–1878) ===
A new public company with more capital was needed to fulfill the plans for expansion. Despite its name—The British and Tasmanian Charcoal Iron Company— a majority of the new company's shareholdings were held in Victoria and Tasmania. The subscribed capital of the company was £250,000, of which about two-thirds were held in Victoria. Of this amount, about £50,000 has been paid up.

The main intended market for the BTCIC, was Victoria, and Melbourne in particular, but the Victorian colonial government imposed a duty on imports of manufactured iron items—such as iron wire, nails, bolts and nuts—including those from other Australian colonies such as Tasmania. This meant that initially, the new company would need to make sales of pig-iron in order to establish viable operations. However, the company remained vulnerable to any extension of Victorian import duties to cover pig-iron.

==== Large-scale operation ====
The bulk of the company's new smelting plant was imported. The new blast furnace that was erected at Port Lempriere (now the northern part of Beauty Point) was designed and supplied by Andrew Barklay & Sons, Caledonian Foundry, Kilmarnock, Scotland. The company also brought some skilled personnel from England to operate its new plant.

The blast furnace was lit on 20 May 1876—to 'blow in' the furnace—and iron ore was added for the first time on 25 May 1876. The furnace produced its first iron—a small tapping—on 27 May 1876. It produced 200 tons of pig-iron in its first ten days, but was then 'banked' in readiness for the inauguration ceremony. The plant was inaugurated on 17 June 1876 by Governor Weld, who pulled a lever to put the furnace on blast.

By late November 1876, the furnace was producing at a rate of 250 to 300 tons per week and the plant was importing 1,500 tons per month of Bulli coal, which it was converting to coke in the 40 coke ovens it was operating.

During the summer of early 1877, the dry weather caused a shortage of fresh water to the plant. The boilers were run on sea water for a time, but the furnace needed to be shut down. Pipes were laid to replace open water channels and the furnace was relit in March 1877.

==== Product quality crisis and fight for survival ====
It was reported, in November 1876, that a "some of their make Is exactly the class of iron to command a very high price in England for the manufacture of Bessemer steel. We have seen several casts of really first-class Speiglelsein [sic] iron and a good deal of the iron made will, we believe, class as chromite steel iron, which is extremely valuable in the mother country." This optimistic statement belied the fact that the company was having great trouble selling this iron in Melbourne, where the market was mainly for 'grey iron'. It was also reported that, "Besides, the [chromium rich] iron above referred to, the furnace has been turning out really good foundry pig iron and hematite iron, well suited for foundry purposes."

It was only after it became apparent that sales of the company's pig-iron in Melbourne were slow, that the problem of the high chromium content in much of the pig-iron became critical. The company attempted to turn a vice into a virtue, by labelling the high-chromium iron as 'chromic pigs'. The BTCIC exhibited samples of its pig-iron ('white', 'grey' and 'chromic') at the International Exhibition in Sydney in 1877.

The real operational problem that the company faced was, while it was producing different kinds of iron, there was little control of what kind might emerge in any particular tapping. The company made attempts to closely control the feed to the furnace, employing analytical chemists in this work, but failed to resolve this problem. T.C. Just wrote, "The closest supervision was given and details watched most minutely, but we could never get the iron sufficiently grey or soft, nor could we secure uniformity or quality. A great deal of iron was equal to the best Scotch pig, but this would represent but a small proportion of a tapping, the bulk being white, crystalline and hard".

The presence of chromium made the iron both hard and brittle. The company had no existing market whatsoever for its 'chromic pigs', in Australia; it hoped that the product would be of value in the export market, despite the immense distance between Tasmania and potential markets in Europe. In March 1877, the directors were "anxiously awaiting reports from England, as to the value of their chromic pig-iron, over a thousand tons of which should by this time have arrived at London."

It was not just that the pig-iron contained chromium, but that the amount of chromium varied widely from batch to batch. When two sample pigs were tested in England, one had 1.43% chromium and the other 9.27%. The pig-iron was useless as an alloying material—for alloys used in mining equipment—for that reason. Moreover, any very limited market for 'chromic pigs' was not enough to absorb most of the entire production of a relatively large blast furnace. The chrome content of the pigs was far too low to be classed as ferrochrome, an alloy material used to make chromium steel and, in any case, the manufacture of chromium steel (stainless steel) was still in its infancy at the time.

Experiments were done in England to see if the chromium could be removed by the process of 'puddling', which is used to make wrought iron. It was found that some, but not enough, of the chromium was removed as 'cinder' but also that the 'chromic pigs' were more difficult to puddle. Neither were the 'chromic pigs', despite a superficially similar appearance, suitable as a substitute for spiegeleisen (ferromanganese) in steel-making.

In short, the company's rapidly accumulating stocks of 'chromic pigs' were useless.

As well as the problems it was having with its metallurgy, the company had to consider the financing of its plans for its expansion—to add Bessemer steelmaking and rolling mills—that were beyond its means, under its then current capitalisation. The company blamed the Tasmanian Government's refusal to grant it freehold over its ore deposit for it inability to raise more capital.

==== End of operations and demise ====
After about 6,000 tons of pig-iron had been made—much of it the hitherto unsaleable 'chromic pigs'—the blast furnace was shut down in August 1877, while the company attempted to move the unsold stock of pig-iron. In the case of the 'chromic pigs', that meant finding an entirely new market, as the 'chromic pigs' seemed of no interest to the conventional iron industry of the time.

In early October 1877, the company leased five acres of land south of the Yarra River in Melbourne for the purpose of erecting a pipe casting works and planned to spend £20,000 on it. This seems to have been an attempt to expand in a way suited to its limited capital. Cast iron pipes were typically made from malleable or 'grey iron', and so the new plant may not have provided a large market for the 'chromic pigs' after all. However, the company did have a 12-inch iron pipe cast successfully from 'chromic pig' at the Langlands Foundry in Melbourne. In the end, the pipe plant did not eventuate,

On 1 May 1878, the entire assets of the BTCIC were put up for sale by auction but it seems that the sale did not proceed. Board papers and newspaper reports of the time record that the BTCIC was wound up and the assets transferred, at an agreed price of £38,000, to a new concern, 'The Purchase Company'.

=== The 'Purchase Company' (1878–1885) ===
The shareholders of 'The Purchase Company' were some of the wealthier shareholders of the old BTCIC. T. C. Just, James Scott and W. G. Lempriere, leading identities of the old company, were among those who were appointed directors of the new one. The aim of the new company was to resume iron production at Port Lempriere, by either solving the problem of chromium content or finding a market for the 'chromic pigs'.

Operations never did restart. Dealing with the problems associated with an excessive but also variable chromium content was beyond what could be achieved by 19th-Century metallurgy. In January 1883, it was announced that The Purchase Company had admitted defeat and that the plant was to be broken up and sold.

'The Purchase Company' never seems to have actively pursued using iron ore from the nearby ore deposits of the former Tamar Hematite Iron Company, which were known to be free of chromium; by the time concerned, those ore deposits were occupied by gold mining leases, and besides the deposit was probably too small to feed the large BTCIC blast furnace. T.C. Just did consider obtaining ore from deposits at Blythe River and mixing these with local ore, but—after the poor experience of earlier attempts—he was loath to rely upon laboratory testing alone, and the cost of a trial shipment was not justified once the company's finances were exhausted.

==== Sale of assets and liquidation ====
The assets were advertised for sale by tender, with tenders due on 8 January 1883. Some items, including the little locomotive, had already been sold. An auction sale was held on 16 June 1883 to dispose of the remaining plant, but it seems that many parts of the plant were not sold then.

There was a subsequent auction sale on 19 Feb 1885, with items from the works being sold on the orders of the liquidator of the Purchase Company. Items for sale included pumping engines, the blowing engine, a Chilean mill, and the blast furnace elevator.

== Technology ==
=== Process and equipment ===
==== Dr. Harrison's furnace (1873) ====
The Tasmanian Charcoal Iron Company's smelting process was described as follows in 1872, "The iron is to be smelted by a new principle patented by Dr. W. H. Harrison, of Melbourne, under which hydrogen gas is applied to the reduction of the iron ore."

It seems the process was based on direct reduction but, unlike other direct reduction processes, was intended to make use of hydrogen gas as the reducing agent, instead of carbon monoxide. Harrison was granted a patent (No. 1690 of 1872) for his furnace, the specification details and drawings of which are still held today in the State Library of Victoria. Harrison claimed that his furnace's operation had been proven in the U.S.A., but it seems unlikely that it was.

The furnace was built close to the iron ore mine, at Leonardsborough. Its dimensions were reported as follows, "The furnace is to be 30 ft.by 16ft. and 8ft. high. The flue will be 30ft. high and 4 by 6, the stack 50ft.high." There was also an 'iron retort', which probably was for the production of the reducing gas.

Its operational life was brief. After the furnace was charged on 18 April 1873, the intense heat split the brick chimney apart. It seems that a small quantity of iron was made before the damage occurred. Nothing of this substantial structure survives today, which suggests that the furnace was later demolished.

Harrison's furnace was not the only attempt at direct reduction ironmaking, in Australasia during the 19th century; iron ore had been smelted at the Fitzroy Iron Works, in a Catalan forge from 1848 to around 1852 and in a puddling furnace in the mid-1850s, and an elaborate direct reduction process was used at the Onehunga Ironworks in New Zealand during the 1880s.

==== Blast furnace (1876–1877) ====
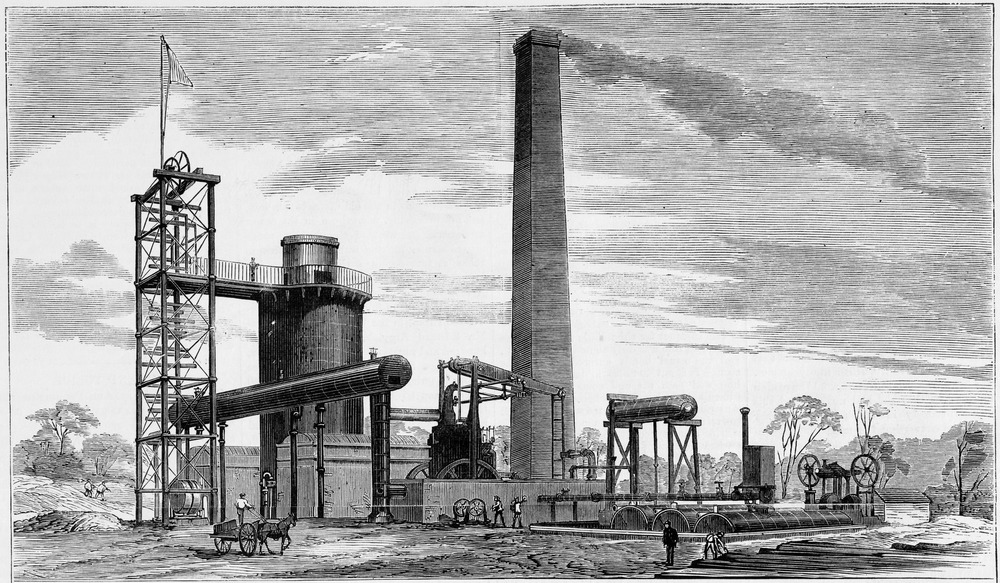
British and Tasmanian Charcoal Iron Company's blast furnace at Port Lempriere (now part of Beauty Point, Tasmania). Unknown artist / engraver. State Library of Victoria. This view was made in or before December 1875. On the far left is the steam-powered elevator. The blast furnace is to its right, with the two hot-blast stoves at its base and the air-receiver running horozontally. Between the blast furnace and the tall chimney is the blowing-engine and blast cylinders (shown prior to the erection of its shelter).

The blast furnace was designed and supplied by Andrew Barklay & Sons, Caledonian Foundry, Kilmarnock, Scotland. It was hot-blast but an 'open-top' design, and so did not make use of furnace off-gases as fuel. Its height was limited, to allow use of charcoal as a fuel, although the furnace mainly used coke while in production.

The total height of the furnace was 76 feet and the outside diameter was 23 feet. The outer casing was of plate iron. The largest internal diameter was 15 feet, and its internal volume was 4,000 cubic-feet.

A full charge of the furnace was stated to be between 500 and 600 tons, and it was calculated that the furnace would turn out 300 tons of pig iron per week. This was by far the largest production capacity of any 19th-Century blast furnace in Australia.

The furnace had four tuyeres. The steam engine driving the blast cylinders was rated at 250 horsepower, with cylinders of 36-inch diameter and 7-foot stroke. The blast cylinders were 5 feet 10 inches in diameter, with a stroke of 9 feet. The arrangement included two flywheels of eight tons each. The blowing engine and blast cylinders were coupled in such a manner that, although there was a reciprocating beam, very little net force was applied to that beam; the beam was of relatively light construction.

Air fed to the furnace was first heated in two 'stoves'—each fitted with 120 cast-iron pipes, with two-inch thick walls—to the highest temperature that could be obtained without damaging the pipes. The chimney-stack was over 100 feet high.

Ore, fuel and limestone were charged from the furnace top, having first been raised by means of an elevator that was powered by a 50-horsepower steam engine.

From the outset, the furnace operated successfully; it was the chome content of the iron ore which would lead to its evental closure.

==== Cokemaking (1876–1877) ====
Forty coke ovens were erected adjacent to the blast furnace at Port Lempriere. After some trials using Newcastle coal, the company settled upon using coking coal from Bulli in New South Wales. Although the company did also use charcoal, the bulk of the pig iron made in 1876–1877 was made using coke.

=== Transport ===
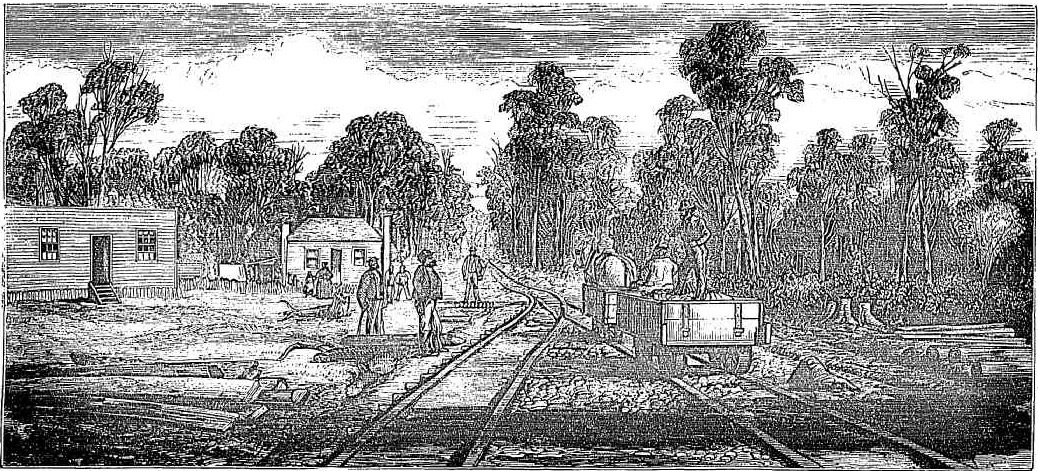
Wooden-railed, horse-drawn tramway (Tasmanian Charcoal Iron Company) Unknown artist / engraver. The view is looking toward the mine. Published in Illustrated Australian News for Home Readers Tue 9 Sep 1873, Page 156.

==== Narrow-gauge wooden-rail tramway (1873) ====
The Tasmanian Charcoal Iron Company constructed a tramway from its minesite to the port. As the company had constructed its Harrison furnace adjacent to the mine, the tramway was never intended to carry large cargoes of iron ore.

The tramway was 2 ft. 6 in. gauge laid with peppermint wood rails (from the Don River) and stringy bark sleepers.

By 1876, it was recognised that the horse-drawn tramway would prove inadequate to keep the large new blast furnace at its port supplied with iron ore, and would need to be replaced with a steam-powered railway.

==== Standard-gauge iron-rail railway (1876–1879) ====
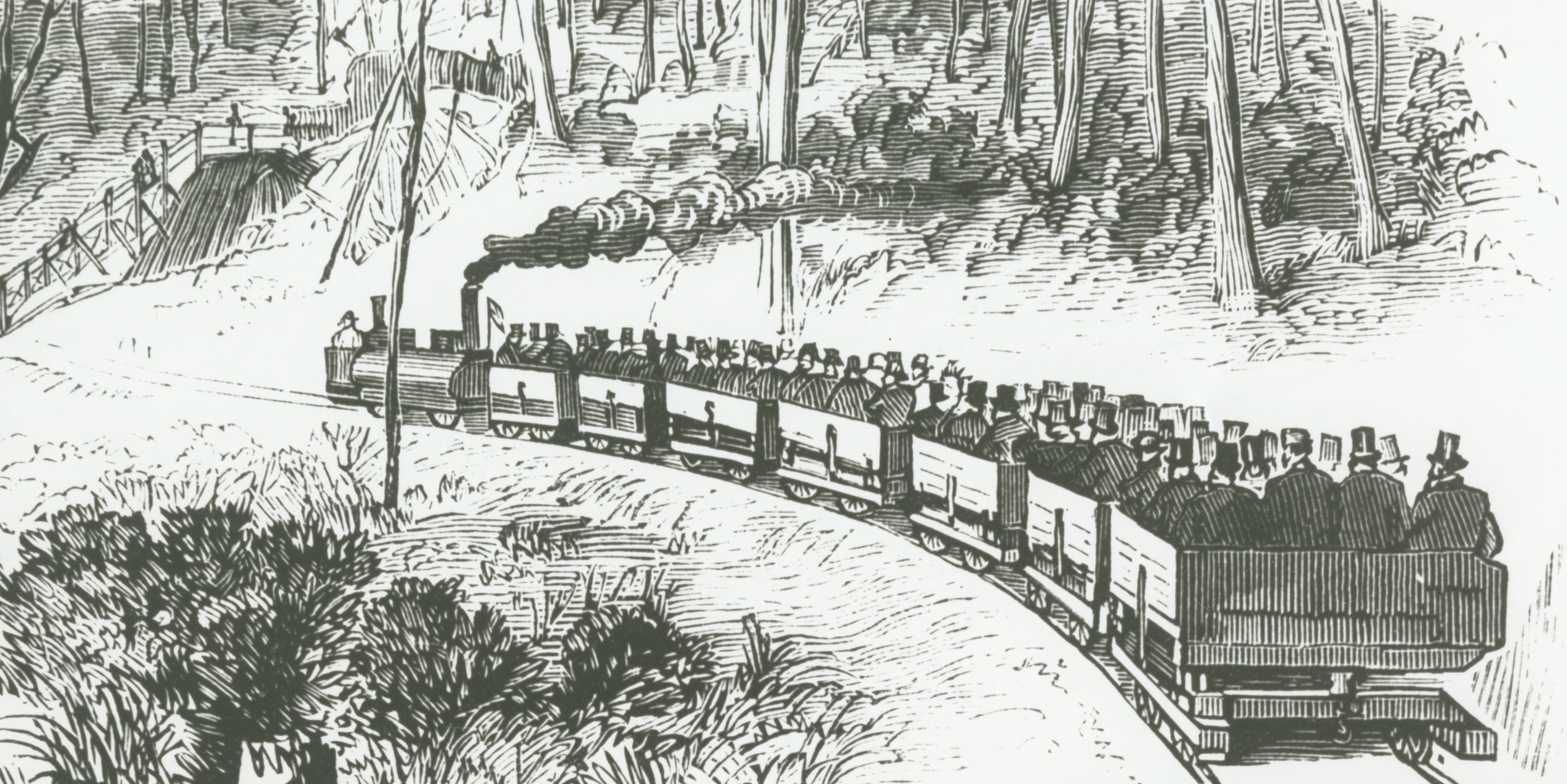
BTCIC's railway carrying official guests, June 1876.

The new railway, constructed by the BTCIC, covered the same route as followed by the earlier wooden-rail tramway, but a new branch of the railway also ran onto the BTCIC's new wharf at the end of Redbill Point.

The railway was 4 ft. 8½ in. gauge, with rails of 50 lb. to the yard.

There was one saddle-tank locomotive, which had been built by Andrew Barklay Sons & Co., in Kilmarnock, Scotland, in 1876. It was capable of moving the ore trains at a speed of 25 miles per hour.

On 9 January 1877, there was a collision between the locomotive and nine fully laden ore trucks that were rolling down the line toward the port, out of control at 50 to 60 miles per hour. Fortunately, there were no fatalities, although the trucks were destroyed, bringing production temporarily to a halt.

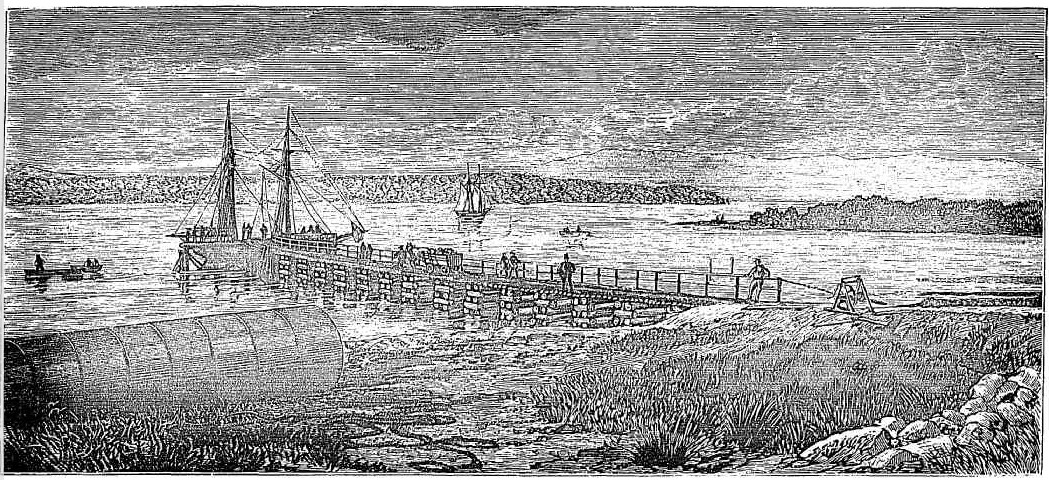
Wharf at Port Lempriere, now part of Beauty Point, Tasmania. (Tasmanian Charcoal Iron Company). Unknown artist / engraver. Published in Illustrated Australian News for Home Readers Tue 9 Sep 1873, Page 156. Shows the smaller of the two wharves and the first one to be built.

==== Wharves ====
The Tasmanian Charcoal Iron Company constructed a 310 feet long timber wharf, located in what is now a part of the township of Beauty Point but then known as Port Lempriere. Due to a tidal range of 12 to 14 feet, this wharf could not be used under all circumstances.

The British and Tasmanian Charcoal Iron Company constructed a second longer timber wharf at the end of Redbill Point. This newer wharf was 600 feet long and, because it extended into deeper water, allowed ships to be docked at all times.

Coal was brought by sea from Bulli in New South Wales and unloaded at the wharf on Redbill Point, in close proximity to the works. In contrast, around the same time, the Fitzroy Iron Works in New South Wales was also using Bulli coal but needed to ship it first to Sydney and then send it by rail it to Mittagong. The contrast demonstrates an advantage of the BTCIC works being located at a seaport.

== Legacy and remnants ==
The BTCIC's blast furnace was the largest and most modern blast furnace of its time in Australia, and only the second—after the modified blast furnace at the Fitzroy Iron Works in 1865—to use hot-blast technology. It was, almost certainly, the first blast furnace in Australia to have been competently designed, constructed and operated, from the outset.

The BTCIC located its blast furnace at a seaport, rather than at the site of its iron ore mine. Together with the economies of scale that its large furnace achieved, such a location meant that it could be more cost competitive than its colonial-era counterparts. It was able to import its coal by sea, making use of the already extensive coastal coal carrying trade. In this respect, it was well ahead of its time.

Very little remains of the BTCIC. The plant was broken up and sold in 1883 and 1885. The casing of the blast furnace was used to make water tanks for the Main Line Railway, which were supported on cast-iron columns that were originally part of the blast furnace's elevator.

The company's little locomotive was sold in 1879 and went to N.S.W.; first to the Hartley Vale Shale Mine, then the Wongawilli Colliery—where it worked once again for an iron and steel venture—and finally to a blue-metal quarry at Berrima, where it was scrapped in 1942. Modern-day West Arm Road follows the first part of the route of the BTCIC railway from near the entrance of the modern-day Beauty Point Tourist Park, the south-eastern part of which is the former site of the blast furnace.

Slag from the iron-making operations can still be found at Redbill Point, and there are traces of the railway formation and the mining activity at Anderson's Creek. The iron ore quarry at Anderson's Creek looks much as it did in 1877, with remains of drill-holes for blasting still visible. Until the late 20th-Century there was still one derelict house standing at 'Leonardsborough'—it is now demolished, although materials from it were reused in the miner's hut display at the Beaconsfield Museum—and piles from the long wharf at the end of Redbill Point were still visible in 2012.

The surplus pig-iron was sold off and some ended up in ornamental iron-castings and fencing in Northern Tasmania; the high chromium content reportedly continued to cause problems when these castings were melted down as scrap during the Second World War.

Of the roughly 6,000 tons of pig-iron produced by the BTCIC's blast furnace, just one rusty pig is known to have survived; it is displayed at the Beaconsfield Mine & Heritage Centre.

== See also ==
- List of 19th-century iron smelting operations in Australia
- Tamar Hematite Iron Company—another 19th-century blast furnace in Northern Tasmania
- Ilfracombe Iron Company—another 19th-century blast furnace in Northern Tasmania
- Onehunga Ironworks—a 19th-century ironworks in New Zealand that originally used direct reduction smelting and later built a blast furnace.
