= South Australian Iron and Steel Company =

The South Australian Iron and Steel Company, officially South Australian Iron and Steel Company Limited, was a colonial era iron-making venture, located in the Hindmarsh Tiers, near Mount Jagged, in the upper reaches of the Hindmarsh River Valley, South Australia. Its blast furnace operated intermittently, over the period from 16 July to 5 December 1874.

== Historical context ==
The presence of hematite and magnetite iron ore in South Australia had been well known, from soon after colonial settlement took place. There had been experimental smelting of the ores as early as the early 1840s. The deposits in the state are vast and widespread, but those in the southern Mount Lofty Ranges, such as at Mount Jagged and Mount Cone (within the modern-day locality of Mount Compass), were relatively close to the newly settled areas around the seaport of Victor Harbor.

There was an increase in pig-iron prices in the early 1870s, which led to the formation of a number of colonial-era iron-making ventures in Australia. A world-wide shortage caused the price of imported pig-iron to increase, from £4 10s per ton in 1870 to £9 per ton in 1873 greatly advantaging locally manufactured iron. However, this high price did not last long, as iron-making capacity increased and pig-iron was once again imported cheaply as ballast in sailing ships returning from England to Australia.

In 1871, James Martin, at the Phoenix Foundry, in Gawler, had smelted a small quantity of iron, using ore from the Barossa Valley. Some of the iron made then survives in an iron fence in Murray Street, Gawler, which commemorates the event.

== Company ==
In December 1873, a prospectus was issued for the South Australian Iron and Steel Company Limited. The new company was, "for the purpose of Smelting and Manufacturing Iron and Steel from the very rich Magnetite and Hematite Iron Ore found at Mount Cone, near Victor Harbour, of which there is a very large quantity in sight, as well as an unlimited supply of Limestone." It held its first shareholder's meeting was held on 22 December 1874. The company's offices were in Grenfell Street, Adelaide. Share scrip issued in February 1874. A call of two shillings per share was made in March 1874.

The colonial parliament of South Australia voted to give bonus of £2000 for the first 500 tons of pig-iron manufactured in the colony. This bonus alone would allow the company to recoup much of the £3000 that it had raised in capital to build its plant, and commence operation.

== Ore mines and blast furnace ==
=== Location ===
In April 1874, the company bought a total of 93 acres, (with a 44-acre lot being for furnace buildings, workshops, huts, sheds, &c.) of land for its furnace and works. The mine and furnace site was in area known as the Hindmarsh Tiers, near Mount Jagged. The furnace site was about nine miles "as the crow flies"—eleven or twelve miles by road—from the seaport of Victor Harbor, along the road to Myponga.

The company's original magnetite and hematite quarry site was about four miles from the furnace site, at Mount Cone (today within Mount Compass). Later hematite ore was found on the company's property at the smelter site. It was this nearby ore that was to be used first.

=== Ore, flux and fuel ===
Detailed analysis of the ores, by Dr William Wallace, of Glasgow, gave the iron content of the magnetite ore as being 66.34% and that of the hematite ore 53.7%. Due to pig iron being an impure form of iron, the pig iron content of the ore was slightly higher; for the magnetite 71.8% and 58.1% for the hematite. Wallace also analysed the composition of a sample of the company's limestone, which is used as a flux in smelting, and found it suitable.

There was no coal resource in South Australia to provide coke. The only alternative, to shipping coal or coke from other colonies, was to use local timber to make charcoal, to use as the fuel and reducing agent.

=== Blast furnace ===
The blast furnace was "built after the design of similar furnaces at work at Vordernberg in Sweden", and was named 'Pioneer'. It was 30 feet high, with an internal capacity of 452 cubic feet. It was "built of firebricks, sheathed with iron plates, girded with iron hoops" and its base was "a pentagon of red bricks, lined with the best English firebricks". The air blower was driven by a 20 h.p. horizontal steam engine, with a vertical boiler, and was capable of 700 cubic feet of air per minute. The furnace and its blast equipment were designed to produce 7½ tons of pig iron every 24-hours.

The choice of charcoal as the fuel limited the height of the furnace—and hence its overall size—because charcoal is not as strong as coke and its capacity to support the weight of ore and flux is less. This is important to ensure that the blast air can flow properly through the burden made up of the materials charged into the furnace. There is no mention of stoves or hot blast; so it appears that the furnace used a cold-blast technology. A cold air blast made it more difficult—but not impossible—to achieve a furnace temperature that allowed molten pig iron and slag to be run from the furnace, and avoiding what was known as a 'chilled hearth'. Cold-blast technology was used successfully in some colonial-era blast furnaces—notably the two furnaces at Lal Lal—but it could not be made to work reliably in others. Some furnaces initially designed as cold blast—the Fitzroy Iron Works, Tamar Hematite Iron Company, and Lithgow Valley Ironworks—were soon switched to hot blast.

== Operations and problems ==
The company was advertising for furnacemen and engineers in January 1874. Construction of the furnace site was well advanced by the end of April 1874. A progress report in May 1874, indicated that all was going well, and that they were aiming to go into production on 24 May 1874.

They were advertising for a manager in June. Mr C.L. Dubois took the position. Charles Lewis Dubois (1817—1914) was an early settler of the colony of South Australia. He was a man of many talents, who had been involved in various businesses—including the 'Nevada Silver Mining Company Limited' and the 'Swan Brewery' in Norwood—and who had a strong long-term interest in the economic advancement of South Australia. Although he appears to have had some knowledge of smelting, unsurprisingly for South Australia at the time, he seems not to have been an experienced iron-works manager.

The furnace was blown in on 16 July 1874, charged with hematite ore, and at 4 a.m. on 18 July, the first iron was run from the furnace. It was a promising start but before long there were problems. Obstructions consisting of half-solidified iron and slag developed in the furnace, as did build ups inside the furnace known as 'scaffolding'. However, the furnace ran with some success from 18 to 26 September 1874, producing around 21 tons of iron of "variable quality," until another obstruction in the hearth grew to a size that the furnace needed to be shut down to remove it. Despite these problems, it seems that the company was optimistic about the future and, in early October, was tendering for charcoal burners to supply 12,000 bushels per month.

In November 1874, samples of pig iron and a piston made from the company's iron were exhibited at the Royal Agricultural and Horticultural Society's show in Adelaide. However, by then, the furnace site was no longer operating, and all the men had been laid off, after the furnace was shut down on 30 October 1874; that was the last of the furnace operation by the South Australian Iron and Steel Company.

The company was in financial trouble, being short of cash to continue operations. Messrs. F. Clarke and Sons made an offer for the company, and operations continued for a time with that source of finance. The furnace was relit on 15 November 1874, but reportedly with similar results to the earlier ones.

According to the manager, C. L. Dubois, the problems had been due to the furnacemen—"two Englishmen, who professed to have a good knowledge of iron smelting by the English method with coke"—but who he claimed had quarrelled about who was responsible for the poor outcomes. Faced with a lack of relevant technical knowledge in the colony, Dubois consulted a book, "Banermann's [sic] Metallurgy of Iron." He claimed this book revealed that the furnacemen had not been operating the furnace properly.

Furnace operation resumed, on 28 November 1874, and apparently went well initially. However, the furnace had suffered damage due to the repeated cooling and reheating over previous months. Large cracks formed, through which hot furnace gases were escaping, becoming so serious as to cause the furnace to be shut down on 5 December 1874. Dubois claimed that, in three days, it had made more iron than over the rest of the period of its operation. But the furnace was ruined by then, at best in need of major repairs.

A writer using a pseudonym, 'Blast Furnace Man', would later opine that the detail design of the blast furnace used by the company was to blame for its troubles. That is conceivably true, but the lack of technical and operational expertise in South Australia seems to be the underlying reason that the furnace could not work reliably.

The company's meeting in December 1874 meeting was told that the cumulative production of pig iron to date had been around 40 tons. It was well short of the 500 tons needed to win the colonial government's £2000 bonus.

== Demise ==
The company's meeting in December 1874 meeting was told that the capital of the company had been nearly expended. In a letter in April 1875, the, by then, "late manager" C.L. Dubois, was lamenting the inability of South Australia to exploit its rich iron ore, and that Tasmania was by then leading the way.

The half-yearly meeting, in July 1875, was told that the company had been unsuccessful in recommencing production or in raising additional capital. However, the directors thought it inadvisable to liquidate the company, until it found out whether the 'Launceston Company' had been able to dispose, at good prices, of 700 tons of iron that it had made (500 tons to Melbourne and 200 tons to Britain). The description of the 'Launceston Company' matches well to the Tamar Hematite Iron Company. Despite producing iron of excellent quality using charcoal fuel, between January and July 1875, that company had difficulty disposing of its iron at an economic price; it planned to raise more capital and expand its operations, to be more economically viable, but that plan came to nothing.

By the time the results of the sales of the Tasmanian iron were known, the market price for iron had fallen further still. A meeting of shareholders, held on 30 December 1875, voted to wind up the company by voluntary liquidation. Its land and other assets were put up for sale by tender in February 1876.

== Legacy ==
The production from the South Australian Iron and Steel Company Limited's furnace would be the last iron smelting in South Australia, until BHP started production at Whyalla Steelworks in 1941. But from 1915 iron ore was mined once again in South Australia—from the vast deposits of the Middleback Range—and shipped to blast furnaces at Newcastle and later Port Kembla, in New South Wales.

There is little left of the South Australian Iron and Steel Company, except its vacant furnace and mine sites and its papers in the state archives.

== See also ==
- Tamar Hematite Iron Company - the Tasmanian iron-making venture referred to as the 'Launceston Company' in this article.
- List of 19th-century iron smelting operations in Australia
