= List of 19th-century iron smelting operations in Australia =

This is a list of 19th-century iron smelting operations in Australia.

The earliest commercial iron ore smelting took place in 1848. There was an increase in pig iron prices in the early 1870s, which led to the formation of a number of colonial-era iron-making ventures in Australia. A world-wide shortage caused the price of imported pig-iron to increase, from £4 10s per ton in 1870 to £9 per ton in 1873 greatly advantaging locally manufactured iron. This period has been called, 'Australia's age of iron.' However, the high prices did not last long, as global iron-making capacity increased, and pig-iron was once again imported cheaply as ballast in sailing ships returning from England to Australia. After 1884, there was no commercial iron smelting in Australia, until William Sandford built a modern blast furnace at Lithgow in 1907.

== Trial smelting in foundries ==
Trial smelting took place in foundries, typically using existing cupola furnaces usually used to melt iron to manufacture castings. Such furnaces could be adapted to make pig iron if charged with iron ore, coke or charcoal, and some limestone as a flux.

Foundry location	Company / Foundry	Period of operation	Production achieved	Client / Source of ore
Mittagong	Fitzroy Iron & Coal Mining Company	Around July 1858	16 hundredweight trial smelting. Pig iron was made in a 'blast furnace' that was probably an adapted foundry cupola furnace.	Ore from Mittagong.
Gawler	Phoenix Foundry, James Martin	c. 1871	Small quantity of iron, some of which still survives in a commemorative fence in Murray St, Gawler.	Ore from Barossa
131 King Street, Melbourne	Railway Foundry, owned by Drysdale and Fraser	November 1872	Two bells, seven 'pigs' weighing 2-stone (12.7 kg) and one pig weighing 3-hundredweight (152 kg), and "half-a-dozen 18lb. [8.2 kg] cannon balls". A total of around 400 kg of iron was made.	Ilfracombe Iron Company, Tasmania
131 King Street, Melbourne	Railway Foundry, owned by Drysdale and Fraser	October 1873	Half a ton.	Ore from near Maldon Victoria, almost certainly from Victorian Iron Company.
131 King Street, Melbourne	Railway Foundry, owned by Drysdale and Fraser	June 1874	Unknown quantity	Ore from a location "within 70 miles of Melbourne, and not more than a quarter of a mile from a main line of railway"; almost certainly ore from Lal Lal Iron Company
Victoria (Precise location uncertain)	(Uncertain, possibly the foundry as above.)	Late 1875	Unknown quantity.	From an ore deposit at Tarrengower, just west of Maldon, Victoria
Ballarat	Union Foundry	November 1873	More than one ton.	Lal Lal Iron Company
Mittagong	Brazenall and Son	Late 1889	Local iron ore was smelted in a small furnace capable of smelting 5 hundredweight of iron. Made cast iron pipe samples and pigs.	Ore from Mittagong
20 Erskine Street, Sydney	Halliday's Engine Works	July 1891	Smelted half a hundredweight of ore, under the direction of William Brazenall.	Ore from Tasmania

== Direct reduction furnaces ==
Direct reduction furnaces operate at temperatures below the melting point of iron and make a semi-solid product known as sponge iron. with molten slag as the waste product.

Smelter Location	Company	Period of operation	Production achieved	Cause of end of production and fate
Mittagong, New South Wales	Fitz Roy Iron Mine	1848 to 1851	Small quantities. made in a small Catalan forge.	Expansion of the works
Mittagong, New South Wales	Fitz Roy Iron Mine Company	To September 1852	2 tons made in a Catalan forge.	Tilt hammer used to make wrought iron broke ending production
Mittagong, New South Wales	Fitz Roy Iron & Coal Mining Company	1855 - 1856	3 tons made in a reverbatory furnace	Financial problems. Later became site of first blast furnace in Australia.
Andersons Creek, Northern Tasmania	Tasmanian Charcoal Iron Company	18 April 1873	Very small quantity	The direct-reduction furnace failed due to extreme heat. The venture became the British and Tasmanian Charcoal iron Company, and subsequently built a blast furnace at Redbill Point.

== Blast furnaces ==
Blast furnaces operate at temperatures above the melting point of iron and make molten pig iron, with molten slag as the waste product. In the 19th century, furnaces used either hot-blast technology—like modern blast furnaces, in which the blast air is preheated to a high temperature—or the older cold-blast technology.

There were both cold-blast and hot-blast furnaces in 19th-century Australia. With only one exception—British and Tasmanian Charcoal Iron Company—all the furnaces were originally built as cold-blast furnaces. A cold air blast made it more difficult—but not impossible—to achieve a furnace temperature that allowed molten pig iron and slag to be run from the furnace, avoiding what was known as a 'chilled hearth'. Cold-blast technology was used successfully in some colonial-era blast furnaces—notably the two furnaces at Lal Lal—but it could not be made to work reliably in others. Some furnaces that were initially designed as cold blast—the Fitzroy Iron Works, Tamar Hematite Iron Company, and Lithgow Valley Ironworks—soon switched, with relative success, to hot-blast technology. With the exception of the modified blast furnace at the Fitzroy Iron Works, none of the furnaces recycled furnace off-gas as a fuel source.

Blast furnace location	Company	Period of operation	Production achieved	Cause of end of production and fate
Mittagong, New South Wales	Fitzroy Iron Works Company	30 July 1864 to January 1866	80 tons (cold blast) 2,394 tons (hot blast)	Deposits, referred to as 'scaffolding', built up inside Australia's first blast furnace. It was modified and later used again in 1876–1877.
Mittagong, New South Wales	Fitzroy Bessemer Steel, Hematite, Iron and Coal Company	5 February 1876 to 16 March 1877	3,273 tons made in a hot-blast furnace	Inability to compete with imported iron on price. Furnace demolished in 1922.
Near Bookham, New South Wales	Bogolong Iron Mining Company	31 March 1874 to 20 May 1874	9 iron pigs made in a small cold-blast furnace (samples only)	Failure of the furnace. Venture did not proceed beyond a trial. Abandoned furnace still stands on private land.
Lithgow, New South Wales	Lithgow Valley Ironworks (later Eskbank Ironworks)	October 1875 to 1882	18,000 tonnes mainly made in a hot-blast furnace. The furnace was converted to hot blast in 1877.	Iron-making was uneconomic at prevailing iron prices. The furnace was demolished in 1882. The rest of the ironworks continued in operation, rerolling scrap iron. Became site of Australia's first modern blast furnace in 1907
Mount Pleasant, New South Wales	Patrick Lahiff, of lllawarra Coal Co. at Mount Pleasant Colliery	1872 to c.1882 (sporadically)	10 tons, made in a small experimental blast furnace, using local clayband ore and coke made from local coal.	The company changed its name to Mt. Pleasant Coal and Iron Co., in 1888 but, up to 1894, failed to obtain investment for a larger furnace, due to limited ore supplies and the unsuccessful outcomes of earlier iron-making ventures.
Hindmarsh Tiers (near Mount Jagged) South Australia	South Australian Iron and Steel Company	16 July 1874 to 5 Dec 1874.	40 tons made in a cold-blast furnace.	Inability to operate its furnace reliably. Land and assets sold in 1876.
A tributary of Middle Arm Creek, Tasmania	Ilfracombe Iron Company	November 1873 to December 1873	Possibly 12 iron pigs (total 2 tons), but more likely none.	Inability to achieve reliable furnace operation. It remains doubtful that any iron at all was produced. Remains of the blast furnace still exist on private land.
Middle Arm Cove, (near modern-day Beaconsfield) Tasmania	Tamar Hematite Iron Company	2 January 1875 to July 1875	600 tons made in a cold-blast furnace that had been converted to hot-blast.	Lack of economies of scale and price competition. Plans to build a larger furnace did not eventuate. Gold was found within the company's mining lease. Any remnants of the furnace were buried under gold mining tailings in 1980s.
Redbill Point, (modern-day Beauty Point) Tasmania	British and Tasmanian Charcoal Iron Company	27 May 1876 to August 1877	6,000 tons made in a hot-blast furnace.	Excessive chromium content of the iron ore and pig iron. Furnace and other equipment sold, in 1883 and 1885, and reused for other purposes. Slag can still be found near the furnace site.
Battery Point, Tasmania	Derwent Iron Company (Tasmania)	July 1874 and November 1874	> 1.5 tons made in a cold-blast furnace.	Initially, a mismatch in furnace capacity and blast capacity. Finally, lack of economies of scale, and uneconomic at prevailing iron prices. Furnace demolished.
Maldon, Victoria	Victorian Iron Company	1873	Approximately one ton made in a small brick furnace.	Unknown.
Lal Lal, Victoria	Lal Lal Iron Company	19 October 1875 to January 1876	127 tons made in its first cold-blast furnace	Equipment breakdown. Upgraded in 1878, including higher blast capacity.
Lal Lal, Victoria	Lal Lal Iron Company (No Liability)	18 October 1878 to 1879	Unknown quantity made in the upgraded first blast furnace	Furnace capacity too low to be economic. Demolished and replaced by second blast furnace.
Lal Lal, Victoria	Lal Lal Iron Company Limited	20 March 1881 to June 1884	2260 tons made in the second cold-blast furnace	Uneconomic at prevailing iron prices Remains of the second blast furnace still exist.

== Ventures that did not enter operation ==
These business ventures were established to smelt iron, but did not build furnaces.

Proposed location	Company	Dates of activity	Proposed operations that were never built	Reason for demise
Northern Tasmania	Swedish Charcoal Iron Company	c.1872	Iron ore mine and blast furnace, in the same district as other similar iron smelting ventures of the same period.	Venture never went beyond issuing a prospectus..
Near Wallerawang, New South Wales	Great Western Iron Works / Great Western Iron & Coal Company / Partners including Enoch Hughes	c.1873	Blast furnace and coke ovens to exploit the iron ore, coal and limestone deposits near Wallerawang. The site near Wallerawang was, in the eyes of experts at the time, a uniquely promising location for an iron and steelworks. Despite this and a later attempt (see below), nothing was ever built there.	The partners who held the mining leases fell out with Enoch Hughes.
Near Wallerawang, New South Wales	A syndicate of English capitalists, organised by Joseph Mitchell.	c. 1890 to 1897	Large iron and steel works based on a contract for steel rails with the N.S.W. Government. The Illawarra was considered as a site, but final plans were for a works near Pipers Flat railway station, using deposits of iron ore, coal and limestone, all located in the vicinity.	Death of its main backer, Joseph Mitchell.
