= Tamar Hematite Iron Company =

Coordinates: 41°11′24.9″S 146°50′07.6″E

The Tamar Hematite Iron Company (THIC) was an iron mining and smelting company that operated from April 1874 to December 1877, in the area close to the location of the modern-day township of Beaconsfield, Tasmania, Australia.

The company's operations consisted of an iron ore mine near Brandy Creek, a blast furnace, jetty and township, on the Middle Arm of the estuary of the Tamar River, a tramway connecting the two sites, and charcoal and brick kilns.

The THIC was the first company to produce iron in commercial quantities from Tasmanian ore and bring their product to market, although others had made small quantities earlier. It was the third company in Australia—at the time considered to be six separate self-governing British colonies—to make commercial quantities of pig-iron that was smelted from Australian iron ore.

Pig-iron of good quality was made in its blast furnace from January 1875, until July 1875 when operations were suspended. Complicated by a decline in the price of pig iron, the venture was uneconomic at the scale of its operations.

Plans to raise capital and increase the scale of production lapsed, after the manager of the company—Algernon Horatio Swifte—died in early-1876. A quartz-reef rich in gold was discovered on land adjacent to the company's lease in mid-1877 and gold mining interests became interested in accessing the company's lease.

In December 1877, the leases and other dormant assets of the THIC were sold cheaply to a group of wealthy and influential investors, under controversial circumstances. It soon became clear that the new owners—collectively known at 'the Hematite Company'—were interested in gold, not iron. In 1878, part of the THIC's original lease was combined with the operations of the adjacent 'Tasmania' gold mine, bringing huge profits to the new owners.

== Historical context ==
Soon after the first settlement in Northern Tasmania, at York Town in 1804, colonial settlers found that there were extensive deposits of iron ore in the hills to the west of the Tamar estuary. Interest in the area was aroused again by the report in 1866 of the Government Geologist, Charles Gould.

There was an increase in pig-iron prices in the early 1870s, which led to the formation of a number of colonial-era iron-making ventures in Australia. The price of imported pig-iron increased, from £4 10s per ton in 1870 to £9 per ton in 1873 greatly advantaging locally manufactured iron. However, this high price did not last long, as iron-making capacity increased and pig-iron was once again imported cheaply as ballast in sailing ships returning from England to Australia.

The Tamar Hematite Iron Company was one of four ventures that smelted iron from local iron ore, in Tasmania during the 1870s; the others were, the British and Tasmanian Charcoal Iron Company, the Ilfracombe Iron Company—both nearby on the Tamar estuary—and the Derwent Iron Company. A fifth venture, the Swedish Charcoal Iron Company never went beyond issuing a prospectus. There were also three commercial iron-smelting operations in mainland Australia during the 1870s, the Fitzroy Iron Works, the Lal Lal Iron Company, and the Lithgow Valley Iron Works.

In July 1877, the cap of a payable gold reef—later known as the Tasmania Reef—was discovered on the eastern slope of Cabbage Tree Hill by brothers William and David Dally, although alluvial gold was known to exist in the area for some years before then.

== Iron ore deposit ==
The ore deposit was the sixth and last of the deposits in the West Tamar area that were mentioned by Charles Gould in his report of 1866. The area that the THIC would later mine lay on approximately 14-acres land to the east of Brandy Creek. Gould also noted that iron ore outcropped at various points in a line that "may be traced south-easterly continuously to Brandy Creek and thence in intervals along the flanks of Cabbage Tree Tier to the eastern side of Middle Arm Creek, some iron cropping out wherever the thickness of marine drift has been sufficiently stripped away to permit of its re-appearance."

The iron ore from the Brandy Creek mine was brown hematite or limonite—with recorded iron contents of 51.1% iron and 46.8%—and was relatively rich compared to contemporary iron ore deposits in England. The THIC won a bronze medal for the iron ore that it exhibited at the Centennial Exposition in Philadelphia, and first prize in its class for iron ore at the Victorian Intercolonial Exhibition of 1875.

== History of operations ==
=== Algernon Swifte and the foundation of the THIC ===
The company was formed around April 1873. The main proponent of the new company was a Tasmanian man, Algernon Horatio Swifte, who became its manager.

He enlisted a group of Melbourne-based investors, including Hastings Cuningham and John Benn, both of whom were wealthy and influential men.

In June 1874, a new mineral lease over the THIC land was taken out in the personal names of Cuningham and Benn, presumably because they had contributed much of the capital for the new company. Only some 14-acres of the leased land—east of Brandy Creek—contained the future iron ore mine, and much of the other leased land was probably intended to be a source of timber—especially for charcoal burning—although some of the land near Cabbage Tree Hill did contain more iron ore. However, all the leased land was leased under the Mineral Leases Act, 1870, something that would later be of great significance. The THIC controlled 620-acres of leasehold land, and another 83-acres of freehold land—in the area around what would become Swifte's Jetty—just south from where Brandy Creek flowed into the Middle Arm of the Tamar estuary.

=== Construction ===
The new company started work quickly. In November 1873, it was advertising for 100,000 bricks to be provided within four months of the order and 20,000 feet of 4-inch by 4-inch hardwood timber in 12-foot or 15-foot lengths, which were the rails for its tramway. In early February 1874, Swifte returned from Melbourne with 6000 fire bricks, fire clay and other material for the blast furnace lining. By March 1874, it was reported that “The Tamar Hematite Iron Company are progressing with their tramway and a small furnace, and hope to be successful in their experimental operations.”

The blast furnace was constructed on land, at a location now known as Scotchman’s Point on the Middle Arm of the estuary of the Tamar River, close to the modern-day town of Beaconsfield. It was constructed, on a rock shelf near the water's edge, against a rockface, so that the tramway could run on the level from the top of the rockface to the charging platform of the furnace. It has been described as a small experimental furnace.

=== Iron smelting operations ===
A small test furnace—made from sandstone quarried at the site—was erected next to the blast furnace to test the ore. It made the first iron smelted from THIC iron ore on 5 December 1874. Using the little furnace "a quantity of pig iron was made, one piece weighing, about ½cwt. [25kg], the slag ran well, separating. from the iron which ran freely" This iron was worked by a blacksmith, Peter Massey, who pronounced it to be "excellent material to work, standing the filing well, and polishing more like steel than iron."

The THIC's blast furnace was charged on New Year's Day 1875, and its first iron was tapped on 2 January 1875. This was the first production of pig-iron made from Tasmanian ore in a commercial quantity—although others had made small quantities of iron earlier—and only the second commercial production of pig-iron from local ore in the six colonies that would later become Australia. The furnace worked well, being tapped every eight hours and casting pigs of 80 lbs, each that carried the brand, "T.H.I. Co.- Charcoal."

The company had employed George Rowley as its furnacekeeper; Rowley also would be associated with some other colonial-era iron-making ventures.

In late Jan 1875, the THIC was seeking tenders for shipping to Melbourne and seeking to employ charcoal burners.

=== Suspension of operations and future plans ===
By the time that the THIC's smelting operations had begun, the price of iron in Australia had fallen from the peak of 1873. Despite the quality of its pig-iron, the company struggled to sell it in Melbourne, at prices that returned an adequate profit. The company's relatively small furnace did not make quantities large enough to sustain a viable operation at the lower prices.

Some iron was sent to Britain and 200 tons of it sold in Glasgow for £6 7s 6d per ton, the landed cost in Britain being estimated as between £4 and £4 10s. In the long term, such an export market was not really viable, given the long distances involved.

Operations were suspended in July 1875, after about 600 tons of pig-iron had been made. In August 1875, the THIC was asking that all accounts owing be submitted for payment. It seemed to be bringing the early operation to a financial as well as operational closure. At the beginning of September 1875, there was still some 200 tons of pig-iron at the works, which was gradually being shipped to market. The THIC's pig-iron was being used at a local foundry in Launceston, in May 1876.

As early as January 1875, the THIC was tendering for up to 150,000 more bricks. It is likely that the bricks were intended for a larger furnace, which was never commenced. It seems that it had always planned to increase the smelting capacity of the works, and raise the additional capital to do so. As late as September 1875, the THIC's plan was reported to be "the re-organisation of the Company on a larger basis".

=== End of the Tamar Hematite Iron Company ===
The death of its manager Algernon Swift, in February 1876, was a major blow for the company. The THIC was facing a protracted period of low iron prices, during which its operations were suspended, without its dedicated Tasmanian manager and local representative.

In March 1877, the THIC's works at Swifte's Jetty were described as "deserted, desolate, and dull, suggestive of the much-lauded energy and enterprise of the Victorians in contradistinction to and at the expense of the Tasmanians ! Why those works should be allowed to go to "wreck and ruin" after so large an expenditure of capital, and with an inexhaustible supply of ore, remains a mystery to all but the initiated."

Such unsympathetic views of the Victorian investors' plight turned more hostile, once payable quartz-reef gold was found in the area. Pressure to cancel the THIC's lease, supposedly to open it up for small-scale gold mining, was building. Some of those working to cancel the THIC's lease were Tasmanian politicians. The THIC's view was that its holding the mineral lease for iron was not a barrier to gold mining, as it had consented to gold mining on its leasehold previously.

In the face of increasing opposition—and even parochial hostility—to the THIC's mineral leases being held by Victorians—and with some perceived risk that those mineral leases might soon be cancelled, without compensation—the THIC's Victorian shareholders finally gave up. In October 1877, the THIC resolved to dispose of its land and assets, with the stated hope that local Tasmanian capitalists might both resume the iron-making operation and work the gold. At the start of November 1877, the leases and assets were put up for sale.

The effective end of the THIC came on 10 December 1877, when the leases and other assets were sold to new owners.

== Technology ==
=== Process and equipment ===
==== Blast furnace ====
No picture survives of the THIC blast furnace, but it was a small furnace that was similar in external appearance to the one at the Derwent Iron Company in Hobart. The furnace was erected by Messrs Shields, of Hobart.

The blast furnace was constructed of freestone—quarried on-site—and bricks made from clay nearby, with a lining of imported English fire-bricks."The whole is substantially built, well bound together with strong hoops, arid the base firmly cramped, together." It had three tuyeres, one on each side and one at the back. The furnace was 40 feet high, with a base of 20 feet square.

It was built as a "Swedish" cold-blast type that used charcoal as fuel and reducing agent. Limestone was used as a flux. Improvements were made to convert it to hot blast and two flues were included below the hearth to maintain its temperature. These changes let the THIC's furnace operate reliably, without the hearth becoming 'chilled'.

The furnace was designed to produce 20 to 25 tons of iron per week. It had the smallest capacity of the colonial-era blast furnaces that entered commercial production— a furnace of twelve times that capacity was used by the British and Tasmanian Charcoal Iron Company and even the revived Fitzroy Iron Works furnace had five times the production capacity—something that constrained the economic viability of the THIC operations, once iron prices fell from their peak of 1873. It seems that it was the company's intention—having commenced operation and proven viability—to seek more capital for a larger smelting operation.

==== Charcoal kilns ====
There were two large charcoal kilns, each capable of turning out 1200 to 1500 bushels of charcoal, over a period of three or four days and nights. These were located alongside the tramway. There was a large charcoal storage shed near the blast furnace.

The kilns were 10-feet wide by 50-feet long, and were constructed of slabs stuck on end into the ground. At one end the walls were 4-foot high, and gradually rose to 8-feet or 9-feet at the other end. Air-vents or "nostril holes" are formed in the sides 4-feet apart, by the insertion of earthen drain pipes. The inside walls were formed of sods, and then the kiln was filled with locally-cut wood, the top was covered with sods, and then fired.

=== Product quality ===
The pig-iron produced by the THIC's blast furnace was good quality and made good castings. THIC iron won first prize in its class at the Victorian Intercolonial Exhibition of 1875.

An analysis of the THIC pig-iron in England provided the results in the table below. These results indicate a high quality pig-iron, which—except for the sulphur content—would meet modern standards.

THIC pig-iron analysis
Iron	94.40%
Combined Carbon	0.96%
Graphite (Carbon)	3.08%
Silicon	0.89%
Sulphur	0.22%
Phosphorus	0.09%
Manganese	0.24%
Loss	0.12%
Total	100.00%

=== Transport ===
==== Tramway ====
The tramway from the mine to Swifte's Jetty—the site of the jetty, township and blast furnace—was 1¾ miles long. It ran through gently sloping country and required only three culverts to be constructed. At the blast furnace end, the tramway ran level right to the charging platform at the furnace top. There are two short branch tramways, one leading to the brick kiln and the other to the jetty.

The tramway was horse-drawn. The gauge was 3-feet and the wooden rails were 4-inch by 4-inch hardwood timber. Some of the wheels for the tramway trucks were cast from THIC pig-iron.

==== Jetty and shipping ====
A timber jetty was erected on Middle Arm close to the site of the blast furnace. Materials and equipment was landed there during construction of other parts of the plant and the nearby township.

The water in the part of Middle Arm near the site of Swifte's Jetty is shallow and the bottom is exposed at low tide. Lighters were used to carry the pig-iron to ships anchored in deeper water. Most of the iron was shipped to Melbourne, but some was shipped to England.

== After iron ==
=== Discovery of gold ===
After iron mining on the THIC lease had ceased in mid-1875, the focus of mining interest around Brandy Creek—now known as Beaconsfield—became quartz-reef gold. The first of the significant quartz-reef gold mining companies, The Brandy Creek Quartz Gold Mining Company was established in December 1876. This company displaced some existing alluvial miners from its lease, and those miners moved to prospect in nearby areas.

Some gold miners who held valid Miner's Rights squatted on THIC lease—with the expectation that the lease would be thrown open as a part of the surrounding goldfield—and started to mine alluvial gold. Under the prevailing legislation, the THIC held the large lease only for the purpose of mining the iron ore and had no right to any gold found there, which was legally the property of the Crown. Some alluvial miners found payable amounts of gold on the THIC leasehold lands, and some pegged claims. The dormant THIC did not interfere in any way with these small-scale gold mining operations; the company later claimed to have provided its consent to work gold on its lease to those whom had asked for it.

In July 1877, the cap of a payable gold reef—later known as the Tasmania Reef—was discovered on the eastern slope of Cabbage Tree Hill, by brothers William and David Dally. Their claim was on Crown land, immediately adjacent to part of the THIC lease.

=== Sale and new owners ===
It appears that at some point, the assets of the THIC were transferred to two of its major shareholders, Melbourne-based investors Hastings Cuningham and John Benn, in whose name the leaseholds were held. It was these two who subsequently put the assets and lease up for sale. The assets and mineral lease of the THIC were originally advertised for a sale by auction on 22 November 1877, but the sale was deferred—possibly twice—until 10 December 1877.

The successful bidder was Ayde Douglas—a prominent Tasmanian politician—with a bid of just £1,700. He was just one of the new owners. The others were three wealthy Tasmanian politicians—William Dawson Grubb, William Hart, Samuel Tulloch—and a Launceston merchant, John Murphy. All these other new owners had recently had dealings—relevant to the THIC—that were associated with gold mining; perhaps that was why it was Ayde Douglas—an investor in the rival Ilfracombe Iron Company and later the buyer of its dormant assets—who bid for the THIC lands and assets.

Hart, Tulloch and Murphy had, as recently as October 1877, been attempting to have the THIC mineral lease cancelled but had failed.

Grubb and Hart had bought the Tasmania Reef claim from the Dally brothers, in October 1877, for £5,000 and a tenth share of any company formed to mine the quartz reef. The THIC leasehold adjoined the Tasmania Reef claim but the full significance of that proximity was not apparent, at the time that Douglas acquired the THIC assets so cheaply.

Although the sale of the lease and assets was the effective end of the Tamar Hematite Iron Company, the collective interest of new owners continued to be known as 'the Hematite Company' for some years later. Their new property comprised "over 700 acres of freehold, leasehold, and other land, with buildings, machinery, and other property".

=== Mineral Lands Act of 1877 and dispute with gold miners ===
On 14 December 1877, Grubb and Hart visited the old THIC lease and gave the alluvial gold miners already working on the lease a notice to quit. This came about unexpectedly; the THIC mineral lease did not give the THIC right to mine gold and, previously, the THIC had consented to gold mining on its lease. It soon became known that the new owners' intransigent position was based on an interpretation of a newly-passed piece of legislation, the Mineral Lands Act of 1877.

The Waste Lands Act 1863, first made provision for mineral leases for terms not exceeding twenty-one years, on any waste lands. The THIC's lease for its leasehold land was made under a later act, The Mineral Leases Act, 1870, which only gave the THIC a right to mine the iron ore, and not gold. Gold mining was subject to a separate Act, The Gold Fields Regulation Act, 1870.

However, one day after the sale of the THIC lease and assets, the Mineral Lands Act of 1877, had come into force. Clause 30 of the new act effectively gave the holder of an existing mineral lease a pre-emptive right to take out a gold lease, if gold had been discovered on any part of the same land. It seems it was an unintended consequence of a clause intended to prevent alluvial tin miners failing to recover gold that was present on their tin-mining leases and to prevent such gold going to waste. However, it is possible that the tin-mining case was only a rationalisation, to justify a loophole that had been created—perhaps deliberately—in the legislation.

After buying the mineral lease, the new owners immediately paid the arrears rent for the lease (£310) and then—as a lessee in good standing until 31 December 1877—pegged a gold mining claim, under The Gold Fields Regulation Act. According to the Goldfield Regulation Act, a gold mining claim needed to be on public display for a period of 30-days, but the new owners had back-dated their claim, allowing no time for an objection to be raised.

Overnight, the price paid for the leased land and other THIC assets by the new owners—mainly wealthy Tasmanian politicians—became a remarkable bargain. The buyers' cronyism, connivance, and conflict of interest—as politicians who had recently debated and voted upon the new Act—seemed obvious, but their actions had been completely legal.

The new arrangements were controversial; there was disputation, during 1878 and 1879, between the new owners—collectively known as 'the Hematite Company'—and the small-scale gold miners, and protests from others concerned about the probity of the way the new owners had acquired the gold rights.

=== Quartz reef mining on the 'Hematite Company' lease ===
By October 1878, it had become well known that the rich Tasmania Reef extended onto the old THIC leasehold land. A new company, The Tasmania Extended Gold Mining Company was set up to mine gold, on ten acres of land on Cabbage Tree Hill, due east of the Tasmanian Mine lease and to the south of two other gold leases. The land included a part of the bounteous Tasmania Reef, which could be accessed by extending the workings of the Tasmania Mine over the boundary of the 'Hematite Company' lease. The 'Hematite Company' interests received a small number of shares in the new company, but received a lucrative 5% royalty on the gold mined.

The Tasmania Mine had paid dividends of over £700,000 by 1900. It was one of the deepest and richest mines in Australia, by the time it closed in 1914. Although William Grubb died in 1879, his family—benefiting from both his share of the Tasmania Mine and the 'Hematite Company' royalty—became even more wealthy, as did the other partners in 'the Hematite Company'.

=== Iron ore deposit ===
Although the underground quartz reef workings would not affect the surface quarrying of iron ore, the surface workings were also soon thrown open to gold mining. The 'Hematite Company' agreed, in March 1879, to allow alluvial miners to work parts of the old lease.; their decision to accept this compromise outcome foreshadowed an amendment made, in November 1880, to the legislation.

The THIC lease's iron ore was not used again, apart from during 1890–1892, when 1,000 tons of ore were shipped to Melbourne for town gas purification.

=== Other ex-THIC assets ===
Swifte's Jetty was replaced in 1879 and the replacement jetty was used to land gold mining equipment, Presumably, the tramway that conveniently ran east-west from the jetty to near the gold mines stayed in use for a while too.

The blast furnace was still standing in 1883, when the government geologist, Gustav Thureau, collected samples of THIC iron from its hearth. Its blast engine and blowing cylinders were still there in November 1883; this is known because Alfred Ritchie was later charged with stealing two engine cylinders to sell as scrap iron. The cylinders had been broken up, before being sold to a foundry in Launceston.

== Legacy and remnants ==
The Mineral Lands Act of 1877 was amended in November 1880. The new act repealed Clause 30 of the 1877 Act, under which the buyers of the THIC assets had craftily acquired a fortune in gold, at the small cost of £1,700 and £310 in arrears rent.

The jetty and the township at Swifte's Jetty on the Middle Arm of the Tamar River estuary—at the locality now known as Scotchman's Point—are now long gone. Any remains of the blast furnace were buried under gold mine tailings that were reprocessed during the 1980s. The area where the old town and iron plant stood was still known as "Swift's [sic] Jetty" well into the 20th-Century, but is no longer known by that name. Algernon Swifte himself is largely forgotten.

The site of the THIC iron ore mine, near Brandy Creek slightly north-west of the modern-day town of Beaconsfield, is now reserved as a source of gravel; iron ore still outcrops at the site. Although it still contains iron ore, the ore deposit is far too small and not rich enough to be commercially viable today.

A part of the cast-iron fence of the Pilgrim Uniting Church—built as a Wesleyan Church—in Paterson St, Launceston is made from pig-iron made by the THIC. The fencing was among the castings made at the foundry of William Peters, in Wellington St, Launceston, in late April 1875.

== See also ==
- List of 19th-century iron smelting operations in Australia
- British and Tasmanian Charcoal Iron Company
- Ilfracombe Iron Company
- Beaconsfield, Tasmania
