= Lal Lal Iron Mine and Smelting Works =

Mining complex near Lal Lal, Victoria, Australia

Coordinates: 37°40′51″S 144°04′24″E

Lal Lal Iron Mine and Smelting Works were located close to the western branch of the Moorabool River, near the town of Lal Lal, Victoria, Australia, which lies on the Geelong-Ballarat railway line about 19 km from Ballarat. From 1875 to 1884, pig iron was made there in a blast furnace using iron ore mined at the site, locally produced charcoal, and limestone from a nearby deposit. The works ultimately proved to be uneconomic. It remains the only attempt to establish an iron smelting industry in Victoria.

The ruin of the blast furnace on the site is one of only three extant 19th-century blast furnace structures in Australia—the other ones being in northern Tasmania and southern New South Wales—and it is the only one of its type in the southern hemisphere. The site is on the Victorian Heritage Register (No. 1759) and the Register of the National Estate.

== Historical context ==
The gold boom created a market for mining machinery and led to foundries being set up in Ballarat. John Walker started the Union Foundry in Ballarat in March 1865. This company and the rival Phoenix Foundry also made locomotives for the Victorian Railways, There was a local demand for scrap-iron and pig-iron in the Ballarat area.

Pig iron was imported, often serving as ballast on sailing ships coming to Australia, and so sold for low prices. An early iron-smelting operation, the Fitzroy Iron Works had not been able to compete with imported iron, and there was no tariff protection of the local iron making industry. However, in the early 1870s, there was a sharp increase in the demand for iron world-wide; demand for iron became so strong in Australia that the price of imported pig-iron increased, from £4 10s.per ton in 1870 to £9 per ton in 1873, greatly advantaging locally manufactured iron. This high price was short-lived, but served as an impetus for ironmaking ventures in Australia.

== Mineral deposits ==
It is likely that the search for gold in the area led to the discovery of other minerals near Lal Lal. Lignite (brown coal) was discovered around 1857, located just alongside the later route of the Geelong to Ballarat Railway. The lignite was useless for iron-making, but limited lignite mining operations at Lal Lal led to a rail siding being built there, which was used to load pig-iron and unload coke and limestone.

In the 1860s, iron ore was found near the western bank of the Moorabool River about 5 km from Lal Lal. The iron ore deposit is limonite. The iron ore varied in depth from 2 to 4 metres and covered an area of approximately 10.6 hectares. The first lease on the iron ore was taken out in early 1873. The inferred resource was later estimated as being around two million tons of iron ore. Another estimate was 700,000 to 850,000 tons of iron oxide.

The iron ore from the deposit was analysed, around 1873, at the Ballarat School of Mines.

Lal Lal Iron Ore Analysis c. 1873.
| Picked Samples of Iron Oxide | Sample 1 | Sample 2 |
|---|---|---|
| Iron Oxide | 68.71 | 70.44 |
| Silica | 17.30 | 16.30 |
| Alumina | 4.89 | 3.58 |
| Calcium Carbonate | 1.06 | 0.60 |
| Magnesium Carbonate | 0.47 | 0.83 |
| Sulphur | Trace | Trace |
| Phosphoric Acid | Trace | Trace |
| Organic Matter | 0.45 | 0.74 |
| Hydroscopic Moisture | 6.40 | 6.64 |
| Loss | 0.72 | 0.87 |
| TOTAL | 100% | 100% |

Based on the above analysis, the iron metal content was relatively low, but was high enough to excite interest in mining and smelting the ore. The ore was low in phosphorus and sulphur, which Is an advantage for iron making. Its location close to users of pig iron—the foundries of Ballarat—was also an advantage.

Limestone—a flux material for iron-making—existed on a property called 'Lowndes Bridge', nearby to the station on the Geelong-Ballarat railway line then called ‘Leigh-road' (now called Bannockburn). There were also deposits of clay on the lease and enough trees to provide a supply of charcoal for a furnace.

== History of operations ==
=== Lal Lal Iron Co. and first period of operation (1873–1875) ===
In November 1873 a meeting of potential shareholders took place, at which was presented a report of a trial smelting of Lal Lal ore at the Union Foundry in Ballarat. The capital was fixed at £48,000 as 24,000 £2 shares. 12,000 for the promoters and 12,000 for sale to the public (offered at a premium of 2s 6d). Mr Peter Alroe was elected chairman and directors were elected.

In June 1874, some iron ore, from a location within 70 miles from Melbourne and close to a main railway line, was smelted at the Melbourne foundry of Drysdale and Fraser. It is almost certain that this ore came from Lal Lal, although those involved kept the precise location a secret. The iron produced was 'grey iron' suitable for castings.

Between February and July 1874, a tramway line was surveyed to run from the Lignite Siding at Lal Lal to the Iron Mine on the Western Moorabool River. Work on the furnace began some time before July 1874. Joseph Rowley, who had previously been at the Tamar Hematite Iron Co., was appointed blast furnace manager during the second half of 1875, and had some alterations made to the furnace before production commenced. The first iron was tapped on the evening of Tuesday 19 October 1875.

Lack of money—not all the shares on offer were taken up by the public—prevented the construction of the tramway and the company resorted to using bullock teams over the poor roads to and from the mine site. The roads were so poor that, until the construction of the tramway could be completed, the iron-making operations at Lal Lal would be forced to close down for eight or nine months every winter. Winter also prevented charcoal burning and storage, presumably due to wet weather.

The company had produced 127 tonnes of pig iron by January 1876 and constructed 805 metres of cart-road up the steep incline on the lease. The machinery then broke down completely, causing the company to immediately cease production. It was also determined that the steam engine was under-powered.

In October 1875 the company took steps to voluntarily wind up the original company and to dispose of the property and lease, with a view to a re-organisation to increase the capital.

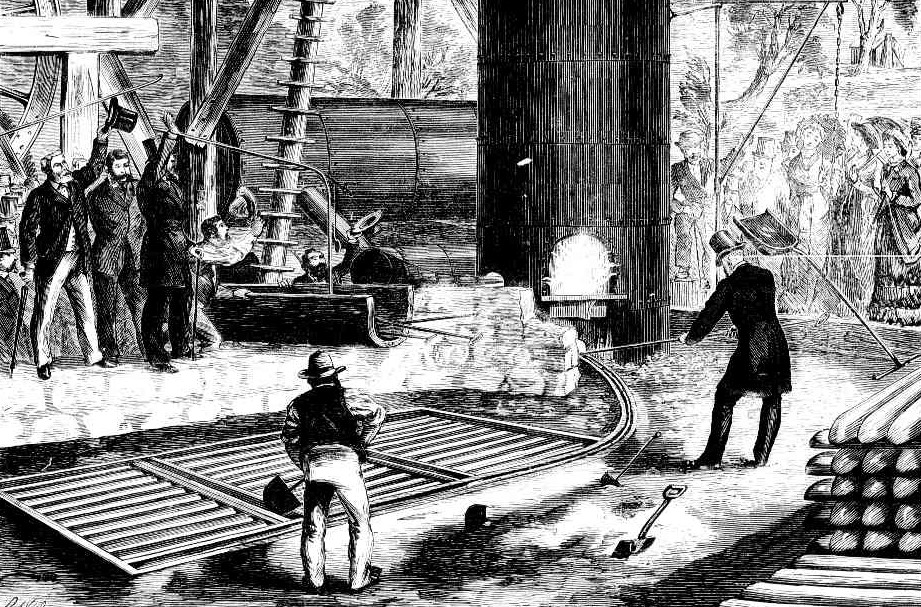
Casting of pig iron from the first blast furnace at Lal Lal in October 1878. (From 'The Illustrated Adelaide News, Wed 1 Jan. 1879, p10) Due to the male and female guests shown in formal dress, this engraving almost certainly shows the official visit by the Premier of Victoria on 26 October 1878.

=== Second period of operation (1876–1879) and No Liability Company ===
In March 1876, he proprietors of the company called a meeting to form a company to buy out the first Lal Lal company, which had run out of cash. Shareholders would contribute 8s per share which entitled them to 1/480th of the new company. Shareholder were asked to submit the money as quickly as possible so that work could recommence at the site. The new No Liability Company was registered on 26 April 1876, with a proposed capital of £9,600 in 2,400 shares of £4 each.

By August 1878, a contract had been given to Joseph Rowley for the erection of new machinery. In September 1878, the company was trying to get cheap rates for rail transport and proposing to make iron pipes.

A new engine, boiler, machinery for the air blast had been installed, but the existing furnace was adapted to the new machinery and relit in October 1878, with the first tap being made on 18 October 1878. The works were officially opened by the Premier of Victoria, Graham Berry, on 26 October 1878. About 800 kilograms of iron was run into moulds on this occasion.

By the end of 1879, the Company found that the furnace was not able to keep-up satisfactory production and decided to erect a larger furnace. On 30 July 1880, the half-yearly meeting of the company was told that work had commenced on new furnace, which was capable of making 80 tons of iron per week, and that new blowing apparatus was being manufactured.

=== Last period of operation (1880 – July 1884) and Limited Company ===
The new blast furnace went into operation on 20 March 1881, being tapped for its first iron on 26 March. It was blown out on 24 June 1881, when the roads became impassable. By then, the company had a foundry in Urquart Street, Ballarat, which would be able to take a part of the iron produced at Lal Lal to make castings.

The new blast furnace started again on 3 Feb 1882, after improvement works delayed its restarting. The furnace worked until it had made 350 tons and then heavy rains arrived and disrupted road transport—the tramway to the rail siding was still not yet built. The 'branch foundry' in Ballarat, had been a success.

The company was able to purchase second-hand rails and other iron hardware items that were needed to construct the tramway, from the Victorian Railways Department. However, in doing so it incurred a debt to that organisation, which was later of great significance.

On 24 July 1883 William Little, Auctioneer and Real Estate Agent of Ballarat, was successful in the registering the Lal Lal Iron Company as a limited liability company, and in that new company acquiring the assets—and liabilities—of the old No Liability Company. The capital of the new company was to consist of £22,500 divided into 15,000 shares of £1/10/- each, of which 7,500 shares were considered to have been fully paid up to £1 each.

In October 1883, the company cast iron pipes—said at the time to be, but not, the first made in Victoria—at its Urquart Street Ballarat foundry.

The long-awaited tramway finally was finished and in operation by April 1884. The tramway was successful, and it appeared that the iron works was at last capable of all-year operation. The company soon had a stockpile of 500 tons of pig iron at the siding, which it could not sell. This iron it instead used to feed its own foundry in Ballarat to produce castings, which were sold profitably.

In June 1884, the blast furnace at Lal Lal was extinguished due to the quantity of stockpiled iron. During the last fortnight of operation the furnace produced 82 tons of pig iron. Iron pipes were also being made at this time.

Unfortunately for the new company, it was soon discovered that the production cost of Lal Lal pig iron in 1884 was £5/17/4 a ton, which was well above the prevailing market rate of £4/10/- for imported iron. William Little and others took legal action against the old No Liabiiity Company—which had not been wound up yet—claiming that the old company had misrepresented the cost of production. The case was eventually settled out of court, but the new company decided to cease smelting at Lal Lal. It was never to recommence.

The foundry in Urquhart Street Ballarat continued to use the stored pig iron—turning it into castings—and remained profitable. The foundry operation, over time, considerably reduced the company's bank overdraft. However, matters came to a head when the Railway Department began pressing for payment for the rails and other hardware that the company had used to build the tramway. The company could not repay this debt and keep operating.

=== Attempted sale of the operation ===
The mine lease and works were put up for sale in 1886. William Cleave Phillips, the company secretary, was apparently trying to sell it as a going concern. The advertisement states that, “Smelting operations can be started without delay”. The equipment of the Urquart-street foundry was also for sale. It does not appear that the Lal Lal site found a buyer in 1886, but it is possible that the foundry in Ballarat was sold. Either way, the foundry kept working—it was still winning work in December 1887—and the Lal Lal site remained dormant.

It was decided at an extraordinary general meeting of members held in Ballarat on 8 July 1889 to wind up the Limited Company. William Cleave Phillips, secretary to the company, was appointed liquidator. An auction sale was advertised in July 1891, clearly with the intention of selling it as a going concern—there is information about a lease of the tramway right-of-way up to 1893. This time the Ballarat foundry is not included in the sale. Nobody turned up to this July 1891 auction. The railways were then asked to remove the tramway rails—which they in effect owned—and the company (in receivership) asked for more time to remove its equipment from the lease. The lease was declared void on 5 July 1892.

In April 1893, only the plant and machinery was for sale by auction. Phillips was now the receiver and the items for sale were still 'the property of Lal Lal Iron Limited’. This time there was no reserve price. It was the end for the Lal Lal smelter; it was in ruins by 1902. The foundry at Urquart St, Ballarat, under different ownership, continued in operation until 1898, when the building became a bakery.

=== Later attempts to revive the Lal Lal iron mine ===
In 1900, another company, Federal Iron Company No Liability, was floated to work the old Lal Lal leases. They planned to erect furnaces at Geelong to process the ore. Mr. Bendarick (a former furnace manager at Lal Lal) and Mr. Kelly (former chairman of the Limited Company) were involve in this venture. In June 1900, these new lessees of the mine were spruiking its benefits showing off Lal Lal iron—presumably smelted in 1884 or earlier—in Melbourne. The company went as far as offering shares, and was still in existence in June 1902. However, it seems not to have proceeded with its planned mine and furnaces.

Another company, Iron, Steel and Metals Manufacturing Company, took up the lease, in 1904, with plans to use a new process to make iron from the Lal Lal ore. In 1913, it was the turn of Lal Lal Iron and Coal Co., which tried to interest a 'London syndicate' in a venture to exploit both the iron and the lignite. Probably the same company—described as 'The Victorian Central Coal and Iron Mining Company, No Liability'—were putting down bore holes In Feb 1913 In May 1913, the wealthy industrialist H.V. McKay spoke about the potential of Lal Lal and the iron industry in general. Finally, in April 1937, some Ballarat residents took up the lease, for a venture to be called the Lal Lal Blast Furnace Iron and Steel Mine. None of these later plans eventuated.

== Technology ==
=== Process and equipment ===
Both of the Lal Lal blast furnaces were 'cold blast' furnaces, with an 'open top'. This was already an archaic technology by the 1880s, because 'hot blast' furnaces—invented in 1828—greatly reduced fuel consumption and increased furnace capacity. A major disadvantage of 'cold-blast', 'open top' technology is that the furnace off-gases—especially combustible and highly poisonous carbon-monoxide—are not recycled (as fuel to heat a hot-blast 'stove' or the blower engine boiler) but are vented instead to the immediate environment. The only advantages of a 'cold blast' furnace were a lower initial capital cost—which may have been a critical factor for Lal Lal—and a less complex operation.

The first furnace was only capable of producing 14 to 16 tons of iron per week, in its original form. It was upgraded with new boiler and air blast machinery, in 1878, but its output was still well short of the 80 to 100 tons per week that the company believed it needed for commercial operation. The first furnace had an iron shell with firebrick lining.

The second furnace was mounted on a stone foundation, used a lining of imported English fire-bricks, packed on the outside with clay, and enclosed in an outer shell made of local stone banded with iron bars. The space between the clay packing and the outer stone casing was filled with stone rubble. The overall height was 17m, of which approximately 14m was the furnace with the remainder being the height of the base. Much of this substantial structure still stands today.

The furnace had a timber bridge from the hillside to the top of the furnace, for charging the furnace. There were three tuyeres—one in each of three arches at the base—through which the air blast was injected. The slag tap and metal tap were built into the fourth arch at the base.

The air blast was provided by steam-powered blowing machinery. A 50 h.p. (37 kW) reciprocating steam-engine drove two blowing cylinders, said to be 3 feet 6 inches in diameter (1067 mm) with a 4 feet 6 inch (1372 mm) stroke. The air passed into an air-receiver 30 feet long (9144 mm) by six feet diameter (1829 mm), then along a pipe to a junction chamber attached to the side of the furnace and finally via three pipes delivering the air-blast to the tuyeres at a pressure of 15 p.s.i.

Water for the boiler and other uses was pumped from the Moorabool River 70m below the blast furnace site.

The furnace used charcoal as the reducing agent, although a considerable amount of coke was also used. Coke—a by-product of gas-making—was brought by rail from gas-works at Geelong and Ballarat. Lal Lal timber proved to make good hard charcoal, suitable to carry the weight of the ore and limestone inside the furnace (soft fuel would otherwise be crushed and not allow the furnace to function). The Lal Lal forest was a good timber resource for charcoal burning. Charcoal burning was carried out on the lease. The company erected a large charcoal shed, in early 1881, to keep their stocks of charcoal dry.

While the first company prospectus suggested the value of the Lal Lal lignite (brown coal) deposit in providing fuel for the blast furnace, no attempt was ever made to use lignite in the furnace or as boiler fuel. Lignite is a poor fuel and not suited in any way for metallurgical uses. It is only recently that attempts have been made to make iron using lignite and the technology has not been in commercial production to date.

Another important factor was the type and quality of the iron ore. The ore containing a higher percentage of silicon gave 'grey iron', whereas the 'white iron' for which the Lal Lal Foundry had a special trade, required ore with less silicon.

=== Transport ===
The Lal Lal Iron Company used the Geelong-Ballarat Railway—opened in 1862—to transport limestone from Leigh Road (now known as Bannockburn), coke from gasworks in Geelong and Ballarat, and for the transport of pig iron from Lal Lal to Ballarat. Until around April 1884, transport between the Lal Lal railway siding and the mine and blast furnace site was by road using bullock wagons. The plant was forced to close down each winter, once the roads became impassable. In the final few months of operation, a tramway allowed reliable transport to and from the siding. The tramway was about 3.5 miles (5.6 km) in length, laid in 50 lb. rails, at 2 feet 6 inch gauge, and on wooden sleepers about 1.2m apart. It was horse-drawn. The most challenging part of the tramway was the descent to the blast furnace site, which was a remarkable piece of surveying.

=== Product quality ===
The cold-blast furnaces using charcoal—together with the low-phosphorus and low-sulphur content of the iron ore—could produce a high-quality iron. The product was cast into a stamper head at John Walker's foundry and found to have wear-resistant properties.

The chairman of the company, Mr. Kelly, stated in October 1878 that, "we were awarded a gold medal at the Paris Exhibition when competing against the product of the most perfect appliances in the world." The company exhibited its pig-iron at the exhibitions in Sydney (1879) and Melbourne (1880).

The quality of the product was shown in 1883, at the formation of the Limited Company, when twenty-one of the largest gold-mining companies in Victoria testified to the value of Lal Lal Iron in mining use. The contribution of this company in the manufacture of pipes, pumps, stamper-heads and other mining equipment was outstanding.

== Remnants and legacy ==
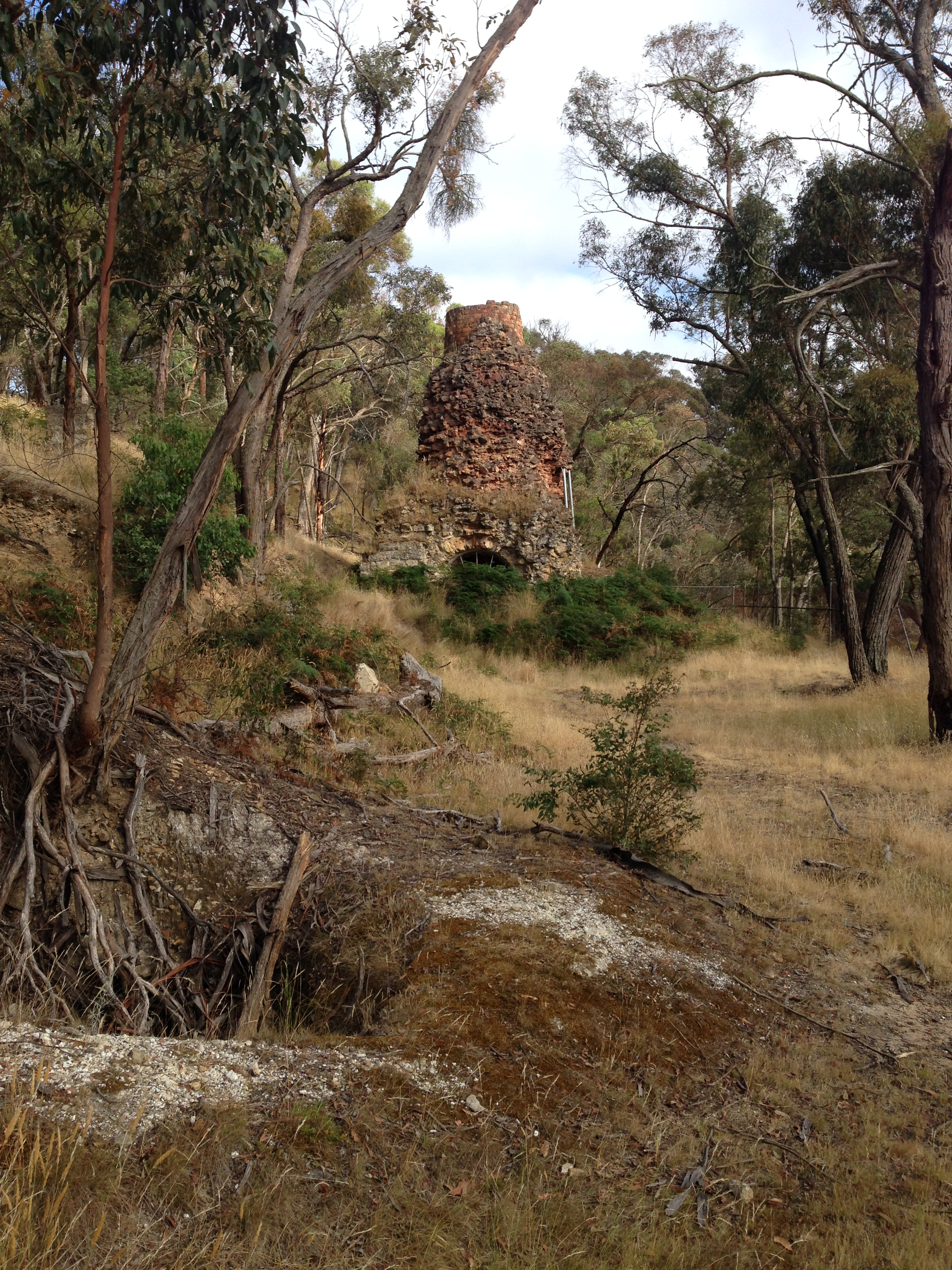
Remains of the blast furnace built in 1880 and in use from 1881 to 1884. (Taken in February 2014)

The site of the mine and blast furnace operation is now a public reserve known as the Lal Lal-Bungal Historic Area, which is also the site of the Bungal Dam on the Western Moorabool River.

The main remnant at the site is the ruin of the blast furnace built in 1880 and last used in 1884. The ruin consists of the square base of the furnace and the circular and tapering inner part of upper furnace structure. Originally, as shown by a photograph taken in 1882, the upper part also included an outer casing made of stone, which was square in horizontal section and tapered evenly with increasing height. That outer casing is now missing.

Near the furnace ruin, foundations and mountings for the furnace machinery are also present. There is also a rare 'Cornish flue', essentially a chimney made of stone that was built at ground level but which rises with the natural incline of the terrain. It probably had the function of removing smoke and noxious gases from the immediate area around the blast furnace.

Below the furnace ruin, downhill toward the river, there is a large dump of slag produced during iron-making operations. Other remnants are the bed of the tramway (in places), clearings where charcoal was burned, and the areas mined for iron ore.

The economics of making iron in colonial Australia ultimately defeated the Lal Lal blast furnace operation, as it did its contemporaries—the Fitzroy Iron Works, the Tamar Hematite Iron Company, and the earliest blast furnace operations of the Eskbank Ironworks. Eventually, greater capitalisation, greater volumes, and finally protection from import competition during the years after Federation saw the growth of a viable Australian iron and steel industry.

== See also ==
- Bogolong iron mine and blast furnace—another existing 19th Century blast furnace ruin, located in New South Wales.
- Ilfracombe Iron Company—another existing 19th-Century blast furnace ruin, located in Northern Tasmania.
- Wundowie charcoal iron and wood distillation plant - a 20th Century plant that made iron using charcoal in Western Australia.
- List of 19th-century iron smelting operations in Australia
