= Beauty Point, Tasmania =

Beauty Point Tasmania
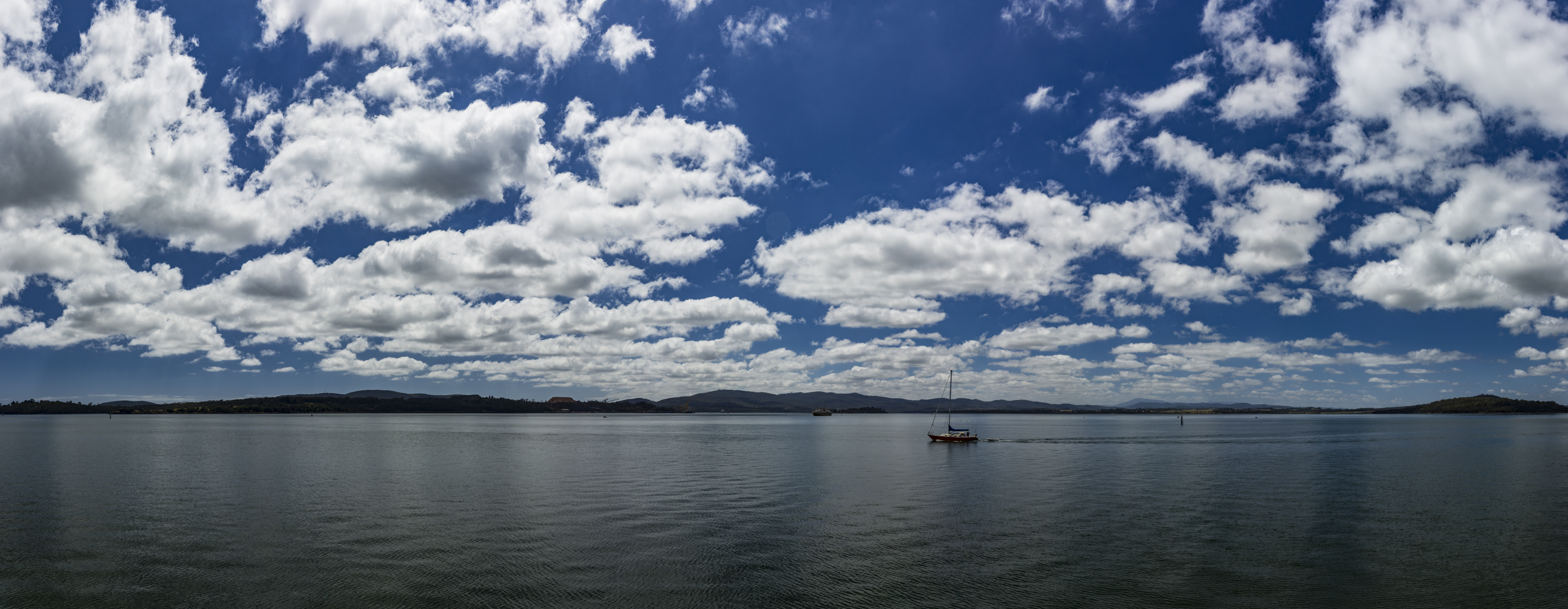
- Beauty Point, Tasmania.

- Coordinates: 41°10′S 146°59′E
- Population: 1,222 (2016 census)
- Postcode(s): 7270
- Location: 244 km (152 mi) N of Hobart; 47 km (29 mi) NW of Launceston; 6 km (4 mi) N of Beaconsfield
- LGA(s): West Tamar Council
- State electorate(s): Bass
- Federal division(s): Bass

Beauty Point is a town by the Tamar River, in the north-east of Tasmania, Australia. It lies 45 km north of Launceston, on the West Tamar Highway and at the 2016 census, had a population of 1,222. It is part of the Municipality of West Tamar Council.

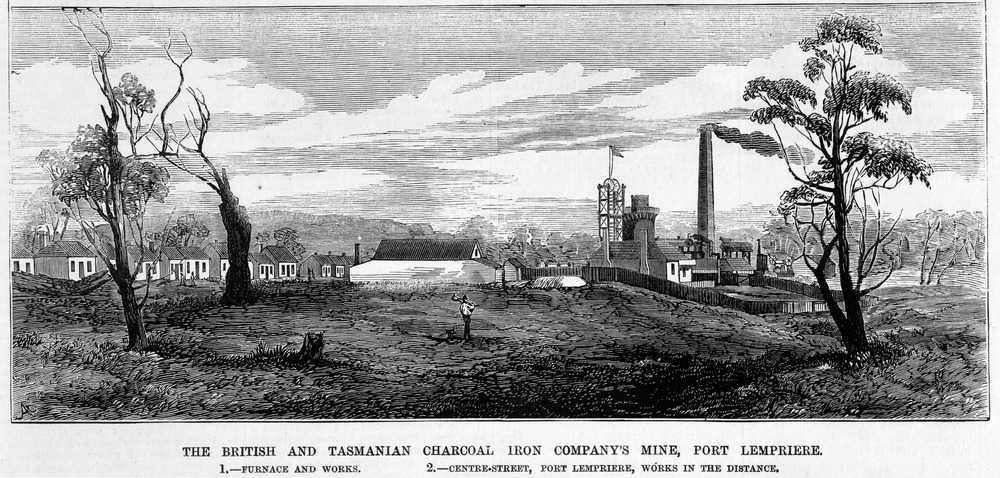
Iron works Port Lampriere, 1875

== History ==
Beauty Point is a tiny township originally established as the first deep water port on the Tamar River. The town was first established as a port to service the nearby gold mine town of Beaconsfield. After the gold rush ended, it became a centre for the export of apples.

During the 1870s, the north-western part of modern-day Beauty Point, near the base of Redbill Point, was known as 'Port Lempriere' and was the site of the blast furnace of the British and Tasmanian Charcoal Iron Company and its two wharves - a 310-foot-long wharf near the blast furnace site and a separate 600 foot-long wharf at the end of Redbill Point. A railway connected the wharves and blast furnace site to the company's iron ore mine - 'Mt Vulcan' - on Anderson's Creek.

The southern part of modern-day Beauty Point—known previously as Ilfracombe—was the site of the jetty of the Ilfracombe Iron Company (Longden's Jetty) and the terminus of its tramway, during the 1870s. Ilfracombe was only ever a port for this venture, and both the company's iron ore mine and blast furnace were located well inland.

The Ilfracombe Post Office opened on 1 October 1903, was renamed Beauty Point in 1904 and ultimately closed in 1991. Ilfraville Post Office nearby opened on 1 December 1941 and was renamed Beauty Point in 1991 when the earlier office of the same name closed.

== Economy ==
Situated on Port Dalrymple (the mouth of the Tamar River) opposite from George Town, Beauty Point lies in the heart of a rich sheep, cattle and vine-growing district. Even so, the town's port facilities form the heart of the present-day economic life.

Beauty Point is also a major fishing town. The Australian Maritime College has a campus here, for courses in fisheries and seamanship. More recently, the town has become the home of Seahorse World, a working seahorse farm and educational centre open to the public. A second tourist attraction, Platypus House, allows visitors to get up close with Tasmanian platypus and echidna. The Beauty Point Slipway provides boat repairs of outstanding quality.

The original Beauty Point wharf, where the first deep water vessels arrived, has been demolished and replaced by the Australian Maritime College, which houses over 100 residential students. The college owns two training vessels.

The town's first wharf was established in response to the growing importance of Beaconsfield which, as a result of the gold boom, was once the third largest town in Tasmania.

== Yachting ==
Beauty Point forms the starting point of the Australian Three Peaks Race, a yachting and running event around the east of the state. It is also the starting point for the Launceston to Hobart Yacht Race, an event also down the east coast.
