= Cupola furnace =

Small blast furnace for melting scrap iron without reduction reactions

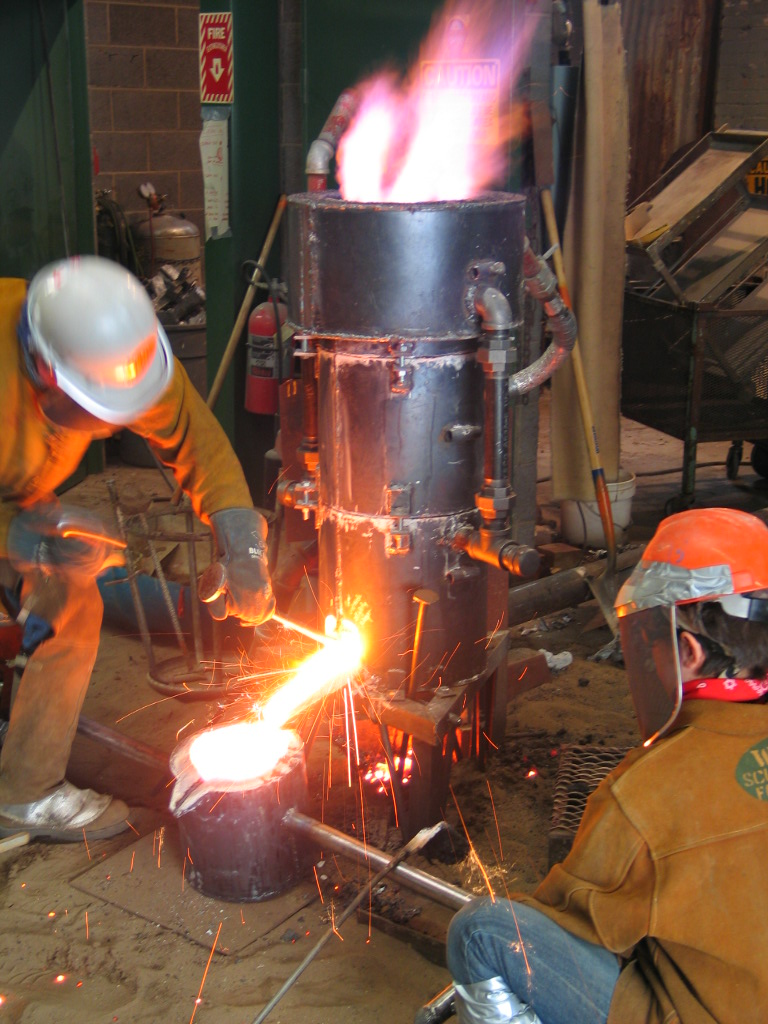
A small cupola furnace in operation at Wayne State University, in Detroit, Michigan.

A cupola or cupola furnace is a melting device used in foundries that can be used to melt cast iron, Ni-resist iron and some bronzes. The cupola can be made almost any practical size. The size of a cupola is expressed in diameters and can range from 1.5 to 13 feet (0.5 to 4.0 m). The overall shape is cylindrical and the equipment is arranged vertically, usually supported by four legs. The overall look is similar to a large smokestack.

The bottom of the cylinder is fitted with doors which swing down and out to 'drop bottom'. The top where gases escape can be open or fitted with a cap to prevent rain from entering the cupola. To control emissions a cupola may be fitted with a cap that is designed to pull the gases into a device to cool the gases and remove particulate matter.

The shell of the cupola, being usually made of steel, has refractory brick and plastic (Note: 'Plastic' in the sense of being applied as a mouldable paste, rather than being made from a polymer.) refractory patching material lining it. The bottom is lined in a similar manner but often a clay and sand mixture ("bod") may be used, as this lining is temporary. Finely divided coal ("sea coal") can be mixed with the clay lining so when heated the coal decomposes and the bod becomes slightly friable, easing the opening up of the tap holes. The bottom lining is compressed or 'rammed' against the bottom doors. Some cupolas are fitted with cooling jackets to keep the sides cool and with oxygen injection to make the coke fire burn hotter.

== History ==
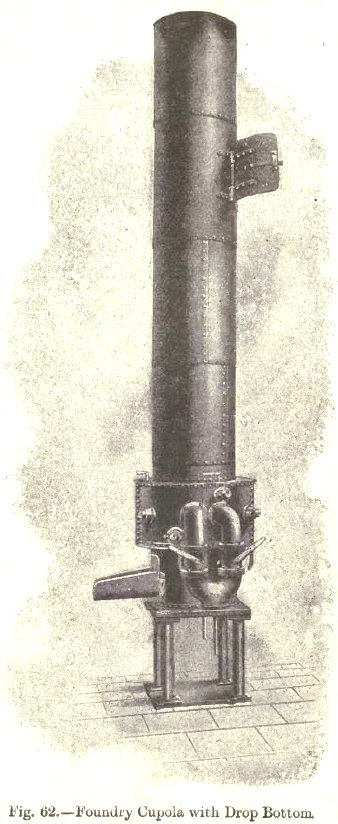
Drop-bottom cupola furnace

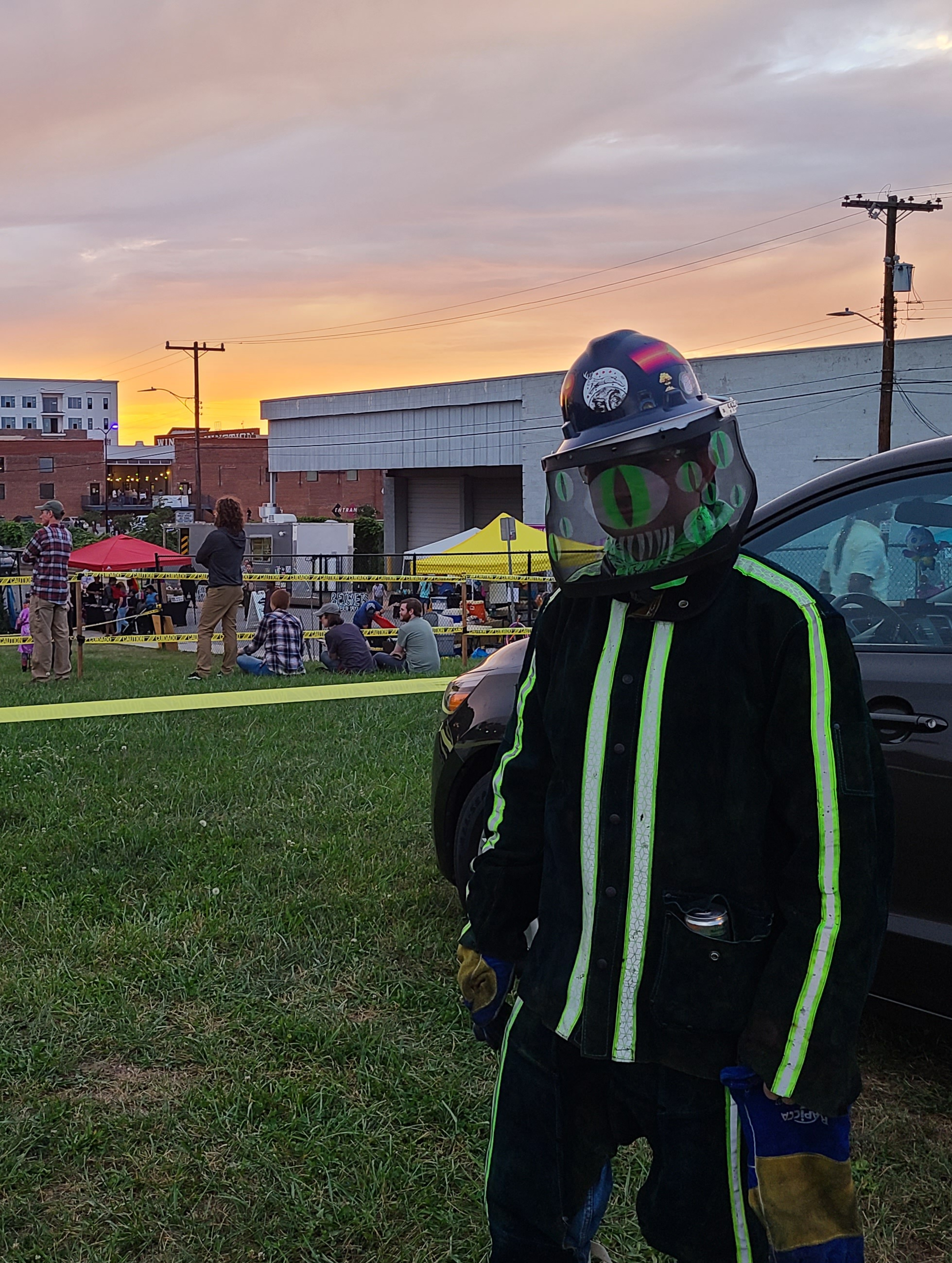
Personal protective equipment to shield from radiant heat and molten splashes

Archeological examples of Iron melting furnaces in China date to the Warring States period (475–221 BC), with several furnace types reconstructed from foundry sites, and larger shaft furnaces were in use before the end of the period. During the Han dynasty (202 BC–AD 220), cupola furnaces were extensively used to remelt pig or scrap iron before casting. Wagner considers it likely that most, perhaps all, iron casting involved cupola remelting, although molten iron may sometimes have been cast directly from blast furnaces. Numerous Han-period cupola furnaces have been excavated, including examples at Guxingzhen, Tieshenggou and Wafangzhuang.

Cupola-type furnaces were used for melting bronze in medieval Europe. Theophilus's 1125 AD description of bell making describes bronze being melted in a bellows-driven furnace that has been characterized as a type of cupola furnace.

== Operation ==
To begin a production run, called a 'cupola campaign', the furnace is filled with layers of coke and ignited with torches. Some smaller cupolas may be ignited with wood to start the coke burning. When the coke is ignited, air is introduced to the coke bed through ports in the sides called tuyeres. Wood, charcoal, or biomass may also be used as fuel for the cupola's fire. Flammable gases also can be added to air and blown through the tuyere section of the furnace to add fuel to the fire.

When the coke is very hot, solid pieces of metal are charged into the furnace through an opening in the top. The metal is alternated with additional layers of fresh coke. Limestone is added to act as a flux. As the heat rises within the stack the metal is melted. It drips down through the coke bed to collect in a pool at the bottom, just above the bottom doors. During the melting process a chemical reaction takes place between the fuel, the blast air, and the metal. The carbon in the coke combines with the oxygen in the air to form carbon monoxide. The carbon monoxide further burns to form carbon dioxide. Some of the carbon is picked up by the falling droplets of molten metal which raises the carbon content of the iron. Silicon carbide, ferromanganese, ferrosilicon, or other alloying agents, often in the form of briquettes, may be added to the charge materials. Silicon carbide dissociates and carbon and silicon enters into the molten metal. Likewise, ferromanganese melts and is combined into the pool of liquid iron in the 'well' at the bottom of the cupola.

Pea-sized raw ore of metals such as iron, copper, lead, and even those containing precious metals can be melted in the cupola or blast furnace. Vannoccio Biringuccio describes how to separate metals and slag by pouring the melted ore contents from the furnace into a small pool then peeling off layers of slag or metal from the top as they cool into a solid.

The operator of the cupola is known as the "cupola tender" or "furnace master". During the operation of a tapped cupola (cupolas may vary in this regard) the tender observes the amount of iron rising in the well of the cupola. When the metal level is sufficiently high, the cupola tender opens the "tap hole" to let the metal flow into a ladle or other container to hold the molten metal. When enough metal is drawn off the "tap hole" is plugged with a refractory plug made of clay.

The cupola tender observes the furnace through the sight glass or peep hole in the tuyeres. Slag will rise to the top of the pool of iron being formed. A slag hole, located higher up on the cylinder of the furnace, and usually to the rear or side of the tap hole, is opened to let the slag flow out. The viscosity is low (with proper fluxing) and the red hot molten slag will flow easily. Sometimes the slag which runs out the slag hole is collected in a small cup shaped tool, allowed to cool and harden. It is fractured and visually examined. With acid refractory lined cupolas a greenish colored slag means the fluxing is proper and adequate. In basic refractory lined cupolas the slag is brown.

When the operation is over, the blast is shut off and the prop under the bottom door is knocked down so that the bottom plates swing open. This enables the cupola remains to drop to the floor or into a bucket. This material is allowed to cool or quenched and subsequently removed from underneath the cupola.

A 'campaign' may last a few hours, a day, weeks or even months. The cupola can be used over and over.

== Quality control ==
During the production, samples may be taken from the metal and poured into small molds. A chill wedge is often poured to monitor the iron quality. These small, approx 18 mm ( 3/4") wide × 38 mm (1 1/2") tall triangular shaped pieces are allowed to cool until the metal has solidified. They are then extracted from the sand mold and quenched in water, wide end first. After cooling in this manner the wedges are fractured and the metal coloration is assessed. A typical fracture will have a whitish color towards the thin area of the wedge and grayish color towards the wide end. The width of the wedge at the point of demarcation between the white and gray areas is measured and compared to normal results for particular iron tensile strengths. This visual method serves as a control measurement.
