= Charles Gould (geologist) =

Geological surveyor of Tasmania

Charles Gould (4 June 1834 – 15 April 1893) was the first geological surveyor of Tasmania from 1859 to 1869.

== Career ==
He was born in England as the son of ornithologist John Gould and natural history illustrator Elizabeth Gould.

He conducted three expeditions into Western Tasmania in the 1860s. He named many of the mountains on the West Coast Range.

He also worked as a consultant geologist and land surveyor in Tasmania, the Bass Strait Islands and in New South Wales. He left Australia in late 1873 and died 20 years later, in Montevideo, Uruguay.

Charles Gould was a member of the Royal Society of Tasmania and an amateur naturalist as well as geologist. He published observations of the distribution, diet and habits of the Tasmanian giant freshwater crayfish in 1870. The species was named Astacopsis gouldi in honour of him by Australian freshwater crayfish ecologist Ellen Clark in 1936.

== Cryptozoology ==
Gould was the author of the book Mythical Monsters (1886) considered an early work on cryptozoology. Prior to this, Gould published in the Papers and Proceedings of Royal Society of Tasmania on the possibility that the Australian mythical creature the "bunyip" was a freshwater seal.

== Publications ==
- Mythical Monsters (1886)
- Gould, C. 1870: On the distribution and habits of the large fresh-water crayfish (Astacus sp.) of the northern rivers of Tasmania. Monthly Notices of Papers and Proceedings of the Royal Society of Tasmania: 42–44.
- Gould, C.1872: Large aquatic animals, Monthly Notices of Papers & Proceedings of the Royal Society of Tasmania, pp. 32–38.

== See also ==
- Geology of Tasmania
