= Zöllner =

Zöllner (literally "toll keeper") is a German surname. Notable people with the surname include:

- Antje Jackelén, née Zöllner, Lutheran theologian and Archbishop of Uppsala
- Johann Karl Friedrich Zöllner (1834–1882), German astronomer
  - Zöllner illusion
  - Zöllner (crater)
- Carl Friedrich Zöllner (1800–1860), German composer
- Carl Heinrich Zöllner (1792–1836), German composer
- Frank Zöllner (born 1956), German art historian and professor
- Heinrich Zöllner (1854–1941), German composer, conductor and librettist
- Robert Zoellner, American stamp collector
- Simon Zöllner (1821–1880), Australian metal manufacturer
- Tom Zoellner (born 1968), American author

Variant "Zollner" without umlaut

- Fred Zollner (1901–1982), founder and co-owner of the Fort Wayne Zollner Pistons
- Gudrun Zollner (born 1960), German politician
- Hans Zollner (born 1966), German theologian and psychologist, Vatican official
- Matthias Zollner (born 1981), German basketball coach
- Zollner, or Zollner Elektronik AG, a German electronics manufacturer founded by de:Manfred Zollner
