= Fitzroy Iron Works =

Early iron smelting works in Mittagong, Australia

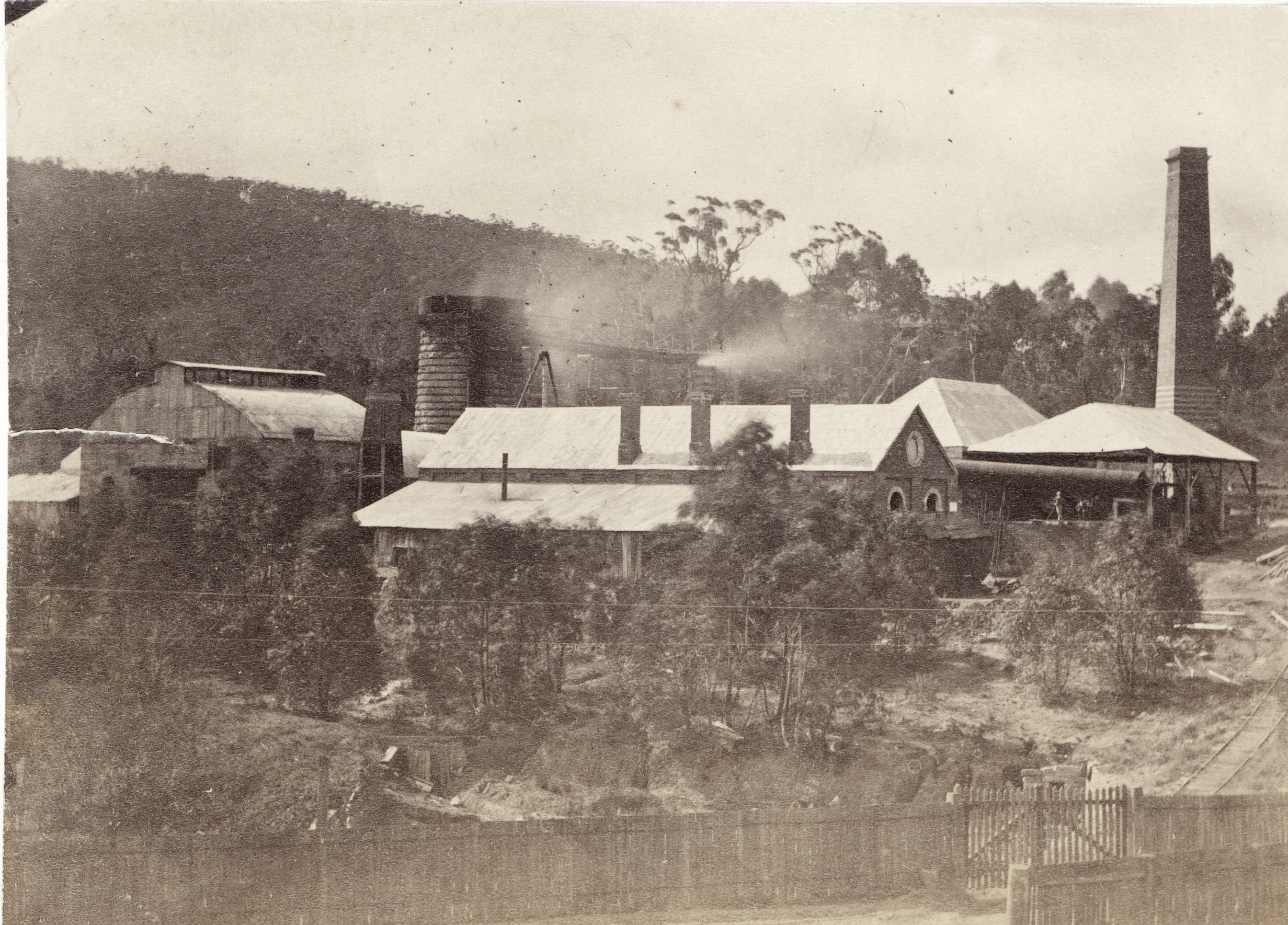
- Fitzroy Iron Works, showing the blast furnace apparently in operation.
- Formerly: Fitzroy Iron Mine
- Type: Iron Mine and Smelting operation
- Founded: 1850
- Founders: John Thomas Neale; Thomas Holmes; Thomas Tipple Smith; William Tipple Smith
- Headquarters: Mittagong, New South Wales, Australia
- Area served: New South Wales
- Products: iron

The Fitzroy Iron Works at Mittagong, New South Wales, was the first commercial iron smelting works in Australia. It first operated in 1848.

From 1848 to around 1910, various owners and lessees attempted to achieve profitable operations but ultimately none succeeded. More than once, new managers repeated more or less the same mistakes made by earlier ones. Over the second half of the 19th century, the name 'Fitzroy Iron Works' became almost synonymous with lost opportunities, repeated failure, lost capital, misplaced trust, and general misfortune.

The Fitzroy Iron Works was—several times—a commercial failure, but it played a part in laying the foundations of the later success of the Australian iron and steel industry, and it was important in the growth of the township of Mittagong.

Relics of the old iron-works discovered during excavations for the redevelopment of its site, during 2004, have been preserved and are on display. There are also some remnants and a commemorative cairn at the adjacent site of its former blast furnace.

== Location ==
Just southwest of the current Mittagong town, the original mine deposit was located just south of the Main Road. The Iron Works were established on the north side of Old Hume Highway and Mt Alexander.

== History ==
=== Discovery of the iron ore deposit (1833) ===
In 1833, the surveyor Jacques noted the presence of iron ore in the course of making a deviation of the Old South Road to the new town of Berrima. The deposit was located near a bridge (Ironstone Bridge) on what was later called Iron Mines Creek and was associated with carbonated chalybeate (iron-rich) mineral springs. Compared with contemporary English iron ore resources, the deposit was a rich one, with grades between 44% and 57% iron.

=== The Fitz Roy Iron Mine and its early operations (1848–1851) ===
In 1848, a local man John Thomas Neale, a Sydney businessmen Thomas Holmes, and the brothers Thomas Tipple Smith and William Tipple Smith formed a partnership to exploit the iron ore deposit. The Smith brothers were sons of the English geologist William Smith. William Tipple Smith later claimed to have discovered gold, at Ophir, in 1848. He did have gold samples in his possession, before the gold rush triggered by Hargraves's well-publicised discovery nearby in 1851. However, Tipple Smith declined to tell the government the location that was the source of his gold, at the time that he found it, in 1848.

William Povey, an ironworks expert, was engaged as manager and some samples of iron products had been sent to Sydney by late 1848. This was not the first iron smelted from Australian iron ore, but it was the first such iron smelted commercially in Australia.

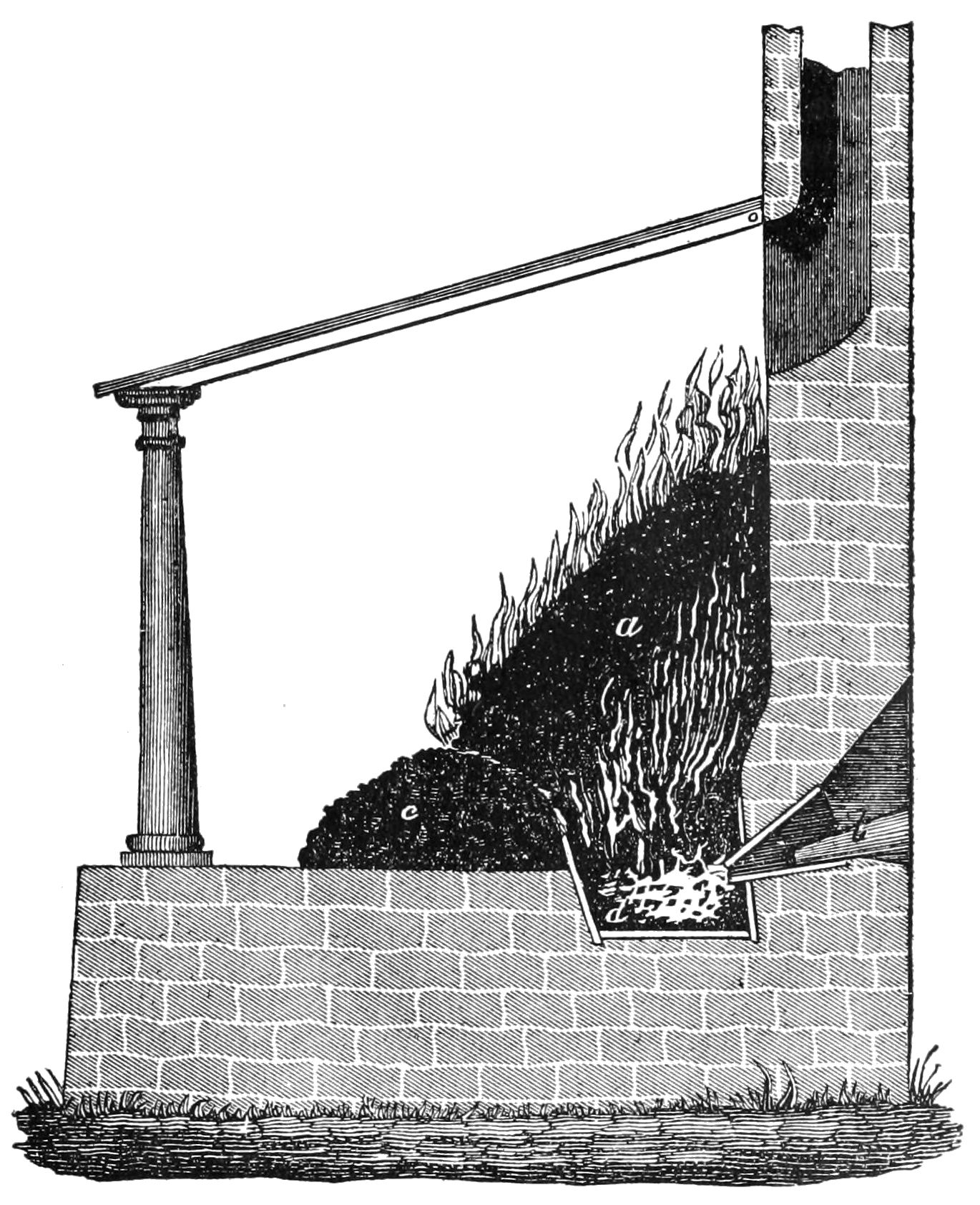
Cross-section of a Catalan forge - The ore was added from the front (left) and the charcoal mixed with fine ore was added to the back. Air was injected through a nozzle (known as a tuyere) at the back (right). The semi-solid bloom of iron grew in the base, which was lined with charcoal. Molten slag was also produced and needed to be drained away periodically.

A report of February 1849 says that iron was smelted using a "Cataline furnace". A Catalan forge was a type of bloomery that included a tuyere through which air under pressure was injected, making it intermediate between earlier bloomery technology and a primitive blast furnace. The fuel used was charcoal. A Catalan forge was operated at temperatures below the melting point of iron and so did not produce molten ‘pig-iron’ (except unintentionally, if the iron melted). The product it made was ‘sponge iron’ (direct reduced iron), which accumulated at the base of the furnace as a ‘bloom’. Sponge iron either could be ‘worked’ to create wrought iron or melted in a cupola furnace to make cast-iron products. Unlike ‘pig-iron’, sponge iron did not contain an excess of carbon and so generally did not need ‘puddling’ before conversion to wrought iron. By the mid-19th century, the Catalan forge was already a largely obsolete smelting technology—the hot-blast furnace had been invented in 1828—but a Catalan forge was relatively simple to construct and operate (refer to illustration).

The subsequent processing of the smelted iron that was used to make the initial samples, in 1848, probably was largely manual—probably using what was essentially a blacksmith's forge— as there was no tilt hammer at the works until 1852.

Governor FitzRoy visited the works in late January 1849. During the visit, he was presented with "an elegant knife, containing twelve different instruments, of colonial workmanship, (mounted in colonial gold) the steel of which was smelted from the ore taken from the Fitz Roy mine". The partners had named their works—originally known as the Ironstone Bridge Ironworks— the Fitz Roy Iron Mine in his honour.

Meanwhile, the partners went about trying to raise capital to allow operation on a larger scale. A prospectus for the Fitz Roy Iron Mine Company was released in February 1849.

Quarrying of ore, brickmaking and erecting a larger Catalan forge to smelt the iron were in progress, when Governor FitzRoy again made visit to the works in March 1850. A cupola furnace and a foundry had been built to process the 'sponge iron' as cast-iron and a tilt hammer was on order from England. A tilt hammer was a type of large, powered mechanical hammer that was used to work the 'sponge iron' bloom and convert it to wrought iron, a process known as 'shingling'.

In commemoration of Governor FitzRoy's visit in March 1850 to officially open the works, fifty cast-iron doorstops, in the form of a lion restant — the lion being a heraldic animal associated with the FitzRoy family—were cast from imported pig-iron that was melted in the cupola furnace.

=== Fitz Roy Iron Mine Company (1851–1854) ===
One founding partner, John Neale left and 15 new shareholders took up a holding in the Fitzroy Iron Mine Company, which was registered on 16 September 1851. William Tipple Smith had a stroke in 1849; he was not actively involved in the new company and died in 1852.

By September 1852, the tilt hammer, and 40 hp engine to drive it, was in the process of erection at the works. The company had produced about 100 blooms weighing in total two tons, when the tilt hammer—critical to the operation—broke and could not be repaired. It became apparent that the use of charcoal as a fuel was expensive and a larger scale of production would be necessary for profitable operation.

=== Fitz Roy Iron & Coal Mining Company (1854–1858) ===
The capital of the company was increased in 1854 and the company was reincorporated as the Fitz Roy Iron & Coal Mining Company. This was to allow rolling equipment to be ordered from England but it also involved a change in control of the company, with the Sydney merchant Frederick John Rothery becoming the largest shareholder and chairman of the board. An issue of shares to the public was not as successful as expected, and to progress the work a loan for £6,000 was taken out, with the Directors taking personal responsibility for it. Later Rothery lent the company another £3,500.

The company purchased from Mr. Povey for £1000, three new tilt hammers that had been brought out from England 16 months earlier, and Povey agreed to take up £500 of shares in the new company.

In 1855, the company used its cupola furnace as a small blast-furnace to smelt some iron ore into pig-iron, which was puddled and then sent to the Sydney works of P. N. Russell & Co., where it was used to make anchors, which with some ore samples and other manufactured items—including razors and a carriage axle—were exhibits at the 1855 Paris Exhibition. This was probably the first time pig-iron had been smelted from Australian iron ore.

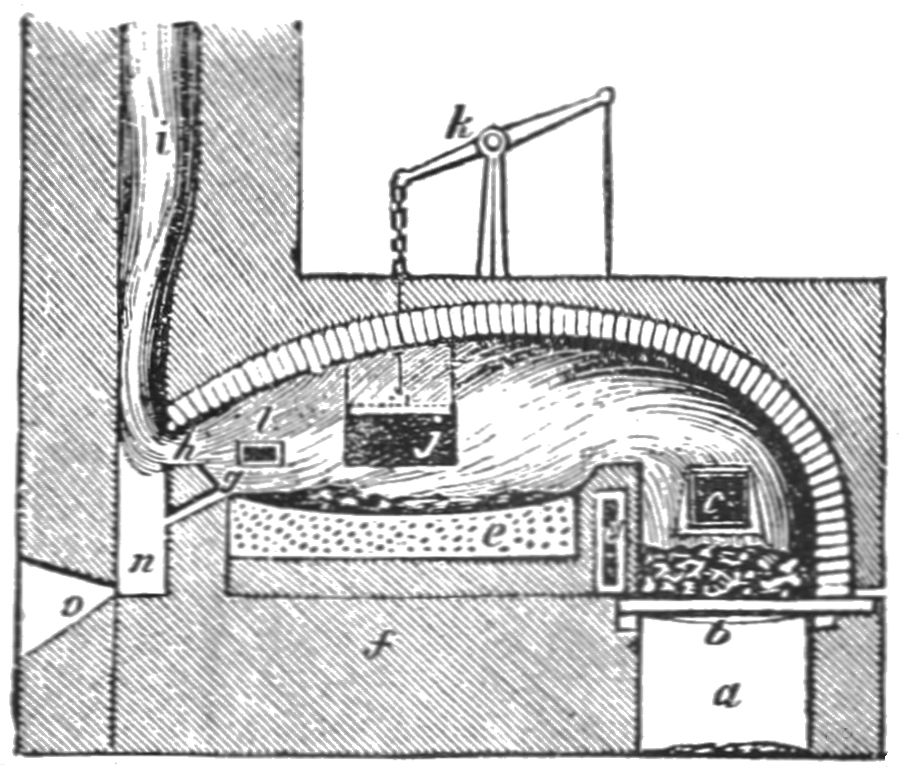
Cross-section of a puddling furnace b. fire grate / fire box, e. puddling bed, d. 'bridge wall', i. flue, j. door

The new directors commissioned an engineering report "on the Company's mines, and on the machinery necessary for working them" from Mr. James Henry Thomas, resident engineer at the Government Dry Dock on Cockatoo Island. In August 1855, the board decided against erecting a blast furnace—on grounds of cost—and instead to erect six puddling furnaces and one reheat furnace. Unusually, it was intended to use the reverberatory ‘puddling’ furnaces for direct reduction smelting of the ore. Thomas provided this description of ore smelting c.1856. “The method hitherto adopted for the reduction of the ores of the Fitz Roy mines, has been, first, to crush into small pieces, and with 25 per cent, of charcoal it is placed in a reverberatory furnace similar to that employed in England for puddling, and the iron before you this evening is the produce of this mode of manufacture. This plan has been adopted (although producing but small quantities) owing to the slight cost of construction compared to the comparative great outlay required in the erection of a blast furnace with it necessary apparatus for blowing, &c.”

A reverberatory furnace used coal as a fuel—without first coking the coal as is needed for a blast furnace—and such a furnace could be reused as a 'puddling furnace' later to process pig-iron from a blast furnace; perhaps, as well as capital cost, these were factors in the decision. Foremost in the directors minds was getting iron—even in relatively small quantities—to market in Sydney.

In anticipation of the new reverberatory furnaces and rolling mills, sourcing of supplies of coal became a priority for the company. Transport to Sydney, in the absence of a rail connection, was also a significant difficulty for the works.

There followed a period of acrimonious dispute between the board of directors and other shareholders, during which the works continued to operate, but little progress was achieved in improving the plant. By 1855, only a total of only three tons of wrought iron had been made. Once the chairman resigned in 1856, and tried to foreclose on his mortgage over the works, operations ceased.

In late April 1856, William Povey became the first of those who would be bankrupted through their involvement in the ironworks over the following half-century.

In 1857, a shareholder and Sydney contractor William Henry Johnson bought the assets but could not refloat the company. He installed the rolling mill that had been ordered under the previous management but could not proceed further through lack of capital. The rolling mill was powered by a 40-horsepower steam engine and had sets of rolls for merchant bars, plate and double-headed rails. It was the first rolling mill installed in Australia for making wrought iron products but—having been left idle—was not the first to enter production.

Around July 1858, a trial smelting of ore took place and 16 hundredweight of "No. 1 iron" was smelted from 2 tons 8 hundredweight of ore; it is almost certain that the "blast furnace" involved in this trial was the existing cupola furnace. Indeed, the works still lacked a blast furnace—the essential first part of the commercial iron-making process—although in other respects it had, by then, the remaining elements of an integrated ironworks.

The discovery of coal nearby, in 1853, and potentially lower transport costs to Sydney—as the railhead of the Main Southern Railway moved progressively closer to Mittagong—led to renewed optimism that a blast furnace could be operated profitably at the works. Johnson received promises of financial support—from William Terrey, Thomas Chalder and Joseph Cartwright—and efforts continued to float a new company; any further progress depended upon obtaining more capital.

=== Fitzroy Iron Works Company (1859–1869) ===
Despite the lack of earlier success, the potential of the mine and the growth of railways in the colony suggested a successful business model would be for the works to produce iron rails. In December 1859, prospectus for the ‘Fitz Roy Ironworks Company’ was published. The prospectus included reference to another report, by J. H. Thomas, dated 6 June 1859, which was quoted as praising the ore and the iron made from it and mentioned that the iron would be used for repairs to railway machinery.

The new company had not raised sufficient capital. It was reformed in 1862–1863, as the Fitz Roy Iron Works Company, when four prominent new shareholders joined; John Keep, John Frazer, Simon Zöllner, and Ebenezer Vickery. Of these four, only Simon Zöllner had any previous working experience in the iron-making industry, although John Keep—later John Keep and Sons—was an ironmonger and Vickery had in his youth been apprenticed to an ironmonger.

In late 1862, the company was working to interest the N.S.W. Government in giving it a contract to supply 10,000 tons of iron rails for the construction of new railways. The price of the rails was to match the landed price of English rails, £12 per ton. However, the works needed more investment, in order to enter larger-scale iron production.

==== Benjamin Lattin and Enoch Hughes (1863-1864) ====
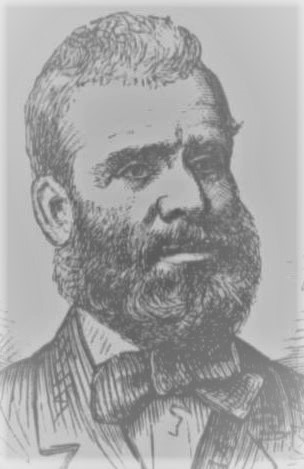
Enoch Hughes c.1879, when manager of Eskbank Ironworks, Lithgow.

Benjamin Wright Lattin was a former wholesale grocer in Melbourne, who leased the Fitzroy Iron Works in early 1863. He agreed to construct a blast furnace—capable of producing 120 to 150 tons of iron per week—at his own cost, in exchange for shares in the company. Lattin chose Enoch Hughes to supervise the construction of the furnace. It seems likely, however, that it was Hughes that had been working to interest Lattin in providing the financial backing for the venture—since late 1862 at least—with the prospect of the rail contract as the key incentive. Indeed, Hughes was already the works manager of the Fitzroy Iron Works, in October 1862, prior to Lattin's involvement.

The arrangement between the company and Lattin was described as follows to a parliamentary inquiry in February 1864; "we have leased the mines to a person of the name of Lattin, from Melbourne, to carry on the mines, giving him the right of working them for twelve months, in consideration of his putting the works in proper order so as to be capable of producing a certain amount of iron per week from the ore; and if at the conclusion he succeeds, we are to give him 2,000 of our paid-up shares, but if he does not succeed he is to get nothing. From a conversation I had with him I believe he will spend from £12,000 to £13,000."

A contemporary report states that it was the intention to proceed with the rail contract from April 1863, but no rails were made during the 12 months over which Lattin leased the works. The construction of the blast furnace took longer than Hughes had envisaged and Lattin had an urgent need for cash flow. In response, scrap iron was purchased at £4 per ton and—using the existing part of the works—that scrap was rerolled into bars. The first merchant bar produced at the Fitzroy Iron Works became available in Sydney, in early December 1863, and it was being produced at a rate of 36 tons per week. Production continued for some months, at a rate of about 30 tons per week.

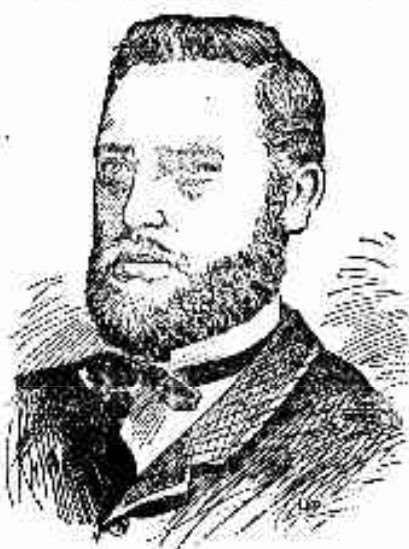
Joseph Kaye Hampshire, Ironmaster of the Fitzroy Iron Works from 1864 to 1867.

As construction of the blast furnace proceeded, preparations for its operation went ahead. The works advertised for limestone in February 1864 and coal miners in March 1864. A 2.5-mile-long horse-operated tramway had been constructed to bring coal from where it outcropped in the Nattai Gorge.

The blast furnace was not complete, when Lattin's contract expired on 1 April 1864. Hughes departed around this time. The directors replaced Hughes with an experienced English ironmaster, Joseph Kaye Hampshire—former manager of the Whittington Iron Works near Chesterfield in Derbyshire—and secured the services of engineer Frederick Davy of the Park Iron Works, Sheffield. Hampshire seems to have been involved in the building of the blowing equipment for Lattin, while in England.

Lattin remained for a short period but left when his financial difficulties increased. In late August 1864, quite soon after the blast furnace was finally lit for the first time, Lattin was insolvent, with a deficiency of £33,762 12s. 8d. He claimed that he had spent over £25,000 on the furnace and other works—double the amount that was anticipated—all of which he had lost.

By October 1865, Lattin was managing the City Iron Works in Sydney, which was re-rolling scrap into merchant bars. Lattin's misfortunes had not ended; he was being sued for unpaid bills at the beginning of October 1869, and it was reported that he was gruesomely killed in November 1869, aboard a French-protectorate flagged barque, in Fiji when about to depart for Queensland. If so, he had become involved—perhaps out of financial desperation— in the trade known as 'blackbirding'—officially called 'indentured labour' but in practice a disguised form of slavery—and met his death at the hands of some of his victims.

==== The first blast furnace (1864–1866) ====
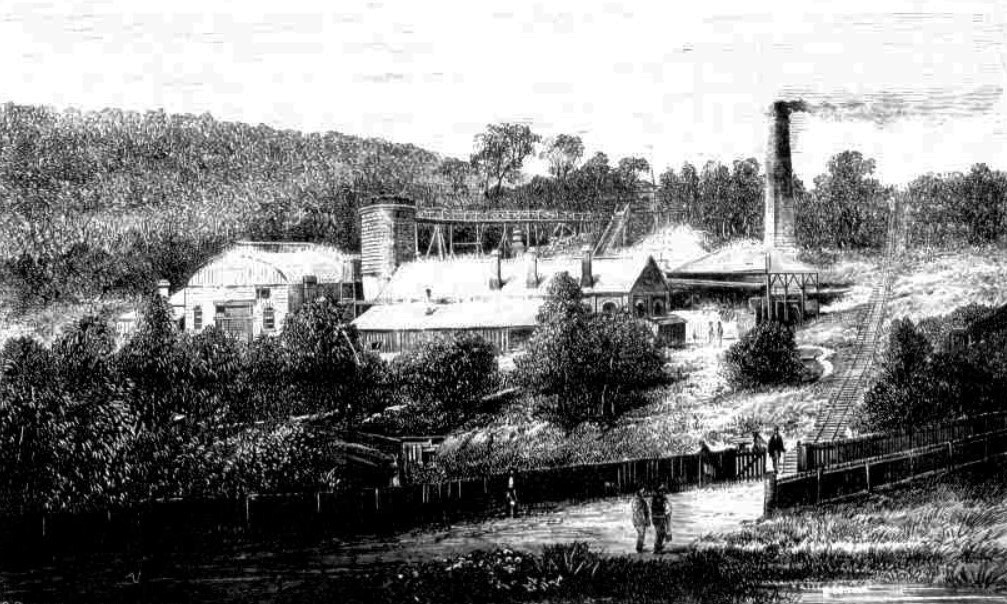
Fitzroy Iron Works - Blast Furnace and 'Top Works'. (From an engraving in the Illustrated Adelaide Post, 21 Feb 1873, Page 9). The sandstone blast furnace is visible just to the left of the centre. The building to the left of the blast furnace is the foundry (cupola furnaces) and the chimney is for the blowing engine.

Enoch Hughes had knowledge of iron working but little working experience of blast furnaces and their operation. The blast furnace he constructed was an old fashioned design—cold blast with an open top—similar to a Scottish design of the 1830s. The outer shell of the furnace was constructed of sandstone blocks and stood 46 feet high to its open top. The base of the furnace was a 28 ft square with the upper part being cylindrical and banded with iron bars holding the courses of blocks in place. It was lined with fire-bricks which were made at the works using clay quarried on the site.

The blast furnace was located at the base of a hill, on the opposite side of Ironmines Creek, 250 yards to the east of the rest of the iron works (puddling furnaces, foundry and rolling mill). This area became known as 'the top works'. There was access to the furnace top from the top of the hill via a timber trestle. The furnace top had a five feet wide platform and three openings through which ore and other smelting materials could be added.

On 30 July 1864, the first blast furnace in Australia made pig-iron—under Hampshire's management—but problems emerged immediately. Moisture in the foundations and lining turned to steam and cooled the iron preventing its being tapped. The furnace had to be shut down and the resulting half-molten mass of iron had to be dragged from the hearth using hooks and metal bars. In September 1864, the company was admitting to "some difficulties with proceeding to production" and advising that the alteration of the blast furnace, to hot-blast operation, had begun. Only 80 tons of iron were made using the cold-blast process.

Drainage trenches were cut into the rock around the base of the furnace, the furnace was relined with new fire-bricks and one 'stove' added to convert the blast furnace to hot-blast. Hampshire designed and supervised the hot-blast modifications himself, skillfully upgrading the antiquated cold-blast furnace's design.

The upgraded blast furnace first made pig-iron using a hot blast, on 2 May 1865. Although production problems would emerge later, the furnace made iron—in taps of three to six tons and occasionally ten tons at a time—at an initial production rate of about 90 tons per week. Hampshire claimed that the ore—after it had been roasted in open heaps to remove moisture and extraneous matter—was producing 60% metal, an indication of its relatively high iron content.

This initial success came just in time; the works had a contract to supply castings for the supporting columns of the Prince Alfred Bridge at Gundagai. It had been delivering these castings at such a slow rate that the construction of the bridge was affected. The first castings had been made using the cold-blast iron but more iron had been needed to complete the work.

The blast furnace had made 2,394 tons of iron, by the time it was shut down in January 1866.

==== Ebenezer Vickery ====
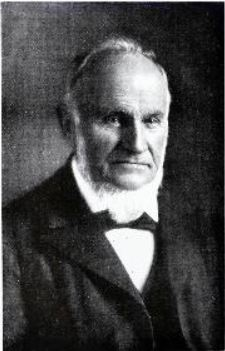
Ebenezer Vickery

Ebenezer Vickery, a Sydney businessman, was elected chairman of the Fitzroy Iron Works Company. He was the main influence on the company, during the period immediately after Benjamin Lattin's contract expired. Vickery was a Methodist—or Wesleyan as they were called then—as was his ironmaster Joseph Hampshire. He saw part of his role as ensuring the proper morality of his workforce and the township. During his time, public buildings were constructed in Mittagong, and between 600 and 700 people (employees and their families) lived off wages paid by the works.

Vickery promoted the use of Fitzroy iron himself. He used it for the roof trusses of Mittagong's Methodist church and in his own building, 'Vickery's Chambers', at 78 Pitt Street, Sydney, a part of which became the Sydney offices of the Fitzroy Iron Works Company.

He set about trying to improve the financial position of the company. In August 1864, a £6,000 mortgage was taken out on the works and in 1865 town allotments were sold in the town of 'New Sheffield', which helped raise additional cash. In February 1865, the capital of the company was reduced by half, effectively writing off much of the earlier investments in the company.

In November 1865, it was reported that the works was supplying iron to P. N. Russell & Co. and to customers in Melbourne for use in manufacturing, that larger puddling furnaces were being erected and the rolling mill was being reinstalled on more solid foundations.

However, in December 1865, with there being ongoing problems with the blast furnace (see below), shareholders voted in favour of a merger with P. N. Russell & Co, a large Sydney foundry and ironworks, which was a large customer buying Fitzroy iron. The merger would result in George Russell taking over the management of the works. An attempt to raise new capital to expand the plant—including adding two more blast furnaces and increasing the power of the rolling mills— in early 1866, failed and, consequentially, the merger did not proceed. Although the works were to linger in partial operation for several more years (see below), the works were completely idle in 1869.

Relations with the New South Wales Government had been nurtured; the Governor, Sir John Young, visited the works twice, once with the Premier, James Martin, in June 1864 and again to witness the casting of a bridge column cylinder in March 1865. However, an attempt by Vickery and his co-directors to obtain a government guarantee for the interest on £50,000 worth of new debentures, in May 1867, failed. The Premier, James Martin—although he had some sympathy for the company and saw a future for it making 'railway bars'—accused the company of previous mismanagement, which Vickery and his co-directors had to acknowledge. Around this time, Benjamin Lattin made public the extent of his losses, which would not have assisted the company's case. There were reports in the press suggesting that the major shareholders had not risked much of their own money but expected government support, which were denied in response. The guarantee also faced active opposition from the N.S.W. Industrial League—supporters of free-trade—who feared that the Fitzroy Iron Works would become a monopoly supplier of iron, if it received government backing.

The company made a 'fourth emergency call' of 10 shillings per share in August 1868. The end finally came when the Bank of New South Wales foreclosed on the mortgage; the works, 1000 acres of land at Mittagong, 26 acres at Marulan and 3000 tons of marketable iron were put up for sale toward the end of 1869.

The Fitzroy Iron Works would be one of very few setbacks in Vickery's otherwise stellar business career. He owned interests in several coal mines, including the Coalcliff Colliery. He retained an interest in Mittagong, was a shareholder in the later Fitzroy Bessemer Steel, Hematite, Iron and Coal Company, and was a founding director of the Mittagong Land Company. He died in 1906.

==== Local competition ====
In 1865, a large rolling operation, the City Iron Works, was set up—for its owners, by Enoch Hughes—on land at Pyrmont, Sydney, immediately adjacent to the Glebe Island Bridge. It bought up locally available scrap iron and rolled it into merchant bars, much in the same way as Hughes had done at the Fitzroy works during 1864. Its first manager was Benjamin Lattin. Closer to its market and to the main source of scrap iron, it was immediately successful, producing about 20 tons of bars per week.

==== Operational problems (1865–1866) ====
Although the blast furnace had been converted to 'hot-blast', there were still deficiencies in its basic design. It remained an open-top furnace and did not have the ability to use the off-gases—mainly carbon monoxide—as a fuel for boilers or to heat the blast. It was thus more costly to operate than it should have been. The furnace only had one stove and so was not capable of applying the hot-blast continuously. It produced relatively expensive iron; in 1865 the landed cost of imported pig-iron was £5 per ton, while that made at the works cost £5 17s 6d.

There were problems with the operation of the blast furnace itself. Soon after operation commenced, deposits—referred to as 'scaffolding'—began to build up inside the furnace and these gradually increased in thickness, restricting the space inside the furnace. The rate of production declined accordingly, falling to just 26 tons per week at the end.

The coal would not coke and so it was being charged directly into the blast furnace. The coal was referred to as 'anthracite', perhaps because it was hard to ignite and would not form coke, or perhaps because anthracite coal had been used in other hot-blast blast furnaces without coking. True anthracite coal is virtually unknown on New South Wales coalfields, and it appears that the term was being used erroneously. It is more likely that the coal was high-ash, poor quality coal that exacerbated the problems with the blast furnace's operation. As early as June 1865, the coal quality was being criticised. It is reported that Hampshire needed to add charcoal or wood, with the coal, to keep the furnace working.

Limestone used for flux could be found at Marulan but, without a rail connection, it had to be carried in drays. A rail connection to Sydney—the main market for products from the works—would not exist until the railway line reached Mittagong in March 1867.

In January 1866, the blast furnace was shut down, but the other parts of the works continued to operate. The company was to lease out its new puddling furnaces and renovated rolling mill, while it sought to remedy the problems with the blast furnace, its lack of suitable coal, and the absence of working capital.

The proposed contract of 1862, to supply 10,000 tons of iron rails—the one that had led to Lattin's involvement in 1863–1864—seems to have been quietly forgotten, by both the N.S.W. Government and the company.

Joseph Hampshire left the works; he died by misadventure on a goldfield near Tuena in 1870.

==== Levick's blast furnace modifications (1868–1869) ====
In December 1867, a new ironmaster, Thomas Levick arrived at the works. He had been engaged by the company and brought out from England. He added a second 'stove' to the blast furnace—providing redundancy and allowing a continuous hot-blast to be applied—and converted the old furnace to a closed-top design—allowing the off-gases to be used as a fuel. A downcomer was added and the off-gases carried through it could be used to fuel the boilers and the hot-blast. The hot blast main built by Hampshire had been installed underground and Levick saw a risk that slag from the furnace could run back into it via the tuyeres; Levick rearranged this blast main so that it ran above ground. He also had the lower part of the furnace—cracked and damaged during the previous furnace campaign—repaired, in late 1868. The fire brick hearth was replaced with local sandstone covered in a layer of fire bricks.

Levick's changes were a considerable improvement and his knowledge had made a valuable contribution. However, in mid-1869, he resigned due to ill health. The blast furnace had not yet re-entered production, when the bank foreclosed on its mortgage in late 1869. The benefits of Levick's modifications would not become apparent, until the furnace was relit, under different management, during the 1870s.

==== Enoch and William Hughes (early 1868) ====
The brothers Enoch and William Hughes, in partnership with John Salter, leased the puddling furnaces and rolling mill between February and June 1868. Enoch Hughes had been Benjamin Lattin's manager in 1863–64 and had previous experience of rolling merchant bar from scrap iron. They puddled the left over pig-iron, then shingled and rolled it. However, they found that the venture was not profitable. While there, Hughes rolled the first plate rolled in Australia, and claimed to have rolled the first rails. The contract with the Hughes Brothers was terminated at the end of June 1868, "in consequence of their inability to provide themselves with funds". The production total for the first half-year of 1868—under the Hughes Brothers—was 164 tons of bars and 30 tons of plate iron, but only 66 tons in total had been sold, leaving 128 tons 'on hand'.

==== Bladen and Company (late 1868) ====
Bladen and Co. under Thomas Bladen, leased the works next, also puddling and rolling iron into merchant bars. He also found the venture unprofitable. It was reported that Bladen & Co. "employ regularly twenty-two hands in the rolling department, consisting of puddlers, underhand men, mill furnace men, shinglers, rollers, engine driver, assistants, and labourers."

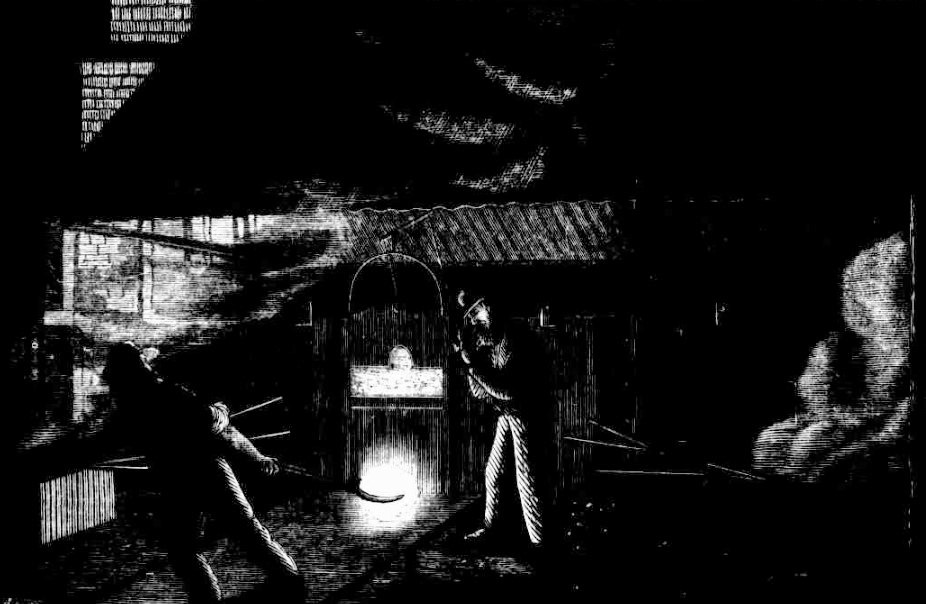
Fitzroy Iron Works - Puddling Furnace c.1868, Unknown Artist (Engraving published in Illustrated Sydney News, Thu, 18 Feb. 1869, Page 4)

==== Puddling, shingling and rolling operations (1868) ====
The process of 'puddling' involved melting—inside a reverberatory furnace—the pig-iron made by the blast furnace, stirring the molten iron—manually, using an iron rod—so as to expose the molten iron to air passing over its surface—and, by this means, lowering its carbon content. In 1868, there were four puddling furnaces; two were in use, one under repair and another used for a heating furnace.

This description of the puddling process applies to the engraving of the puddling furnace:

"This engraving represents the furnace in which the first process for the convertion [sic] of cast into wrought iron takes place, and is technically termed puddling, the molten metal being stirred about, or puddled, by which means the particles are brought into contact with the air, this being the agent by which the requisite chemical changes are brought about. The fusion of the cast iron is effected by the flame passing over it, the fuel being thrown into a separate chamber. The stirring or puddling is accompanied by a frizzling sound, and after a certain time the iron arrives at a pasty condition, and is said to have "come to nature." It is then rolled into balls, one of which is represented in the engraving as being lifted out of the furnace."

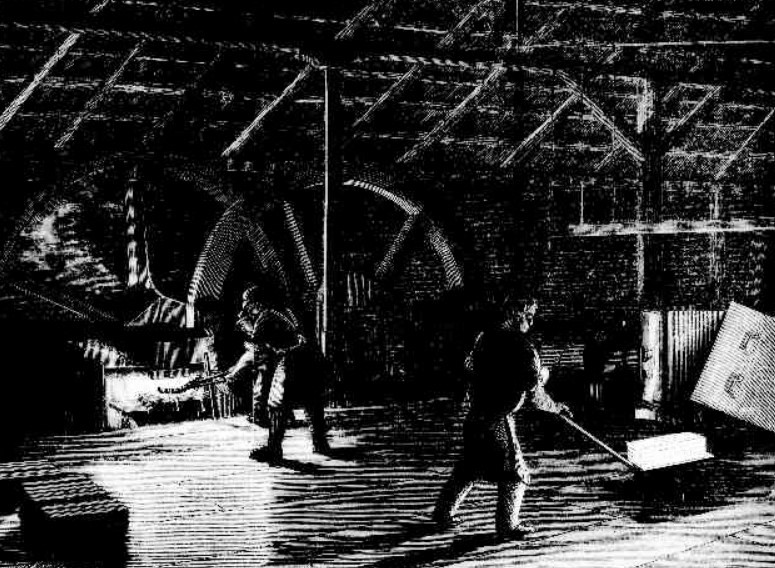
Fitzroy Iron Works - Tilt Hammer c.1868, Unknown Artist (Engraving published in Illustrated Sydney News, Thu. 18 Feb. 1869, Page 5)

The 'balls', when removed from the furnace, weighed from 80 to 100 pounds each, a convenient size to handle.

This description from 1868, gives detail of the tilt hammer operation, known as shingling.

"The hammer to which the ball is taken is a ponderous tilt hammer, worked by a camb [sic] falling with a weight of about a ton, and capable of giving from seventy to eighty blows a minute. Here the " ball " is shingled, the fiery mass being beaten by the falling blows in every direction as it is turned deftly from side to side, and from end to end, by the workman or shingler, until all the refuse and cinder is squeezed and driven out of it, running from it at first in small fiery streams, and afterwards draining out more slowly, and ultimately falling off in heavy flakes. After the balls have undergone this process they acquire the name of "blooms." "

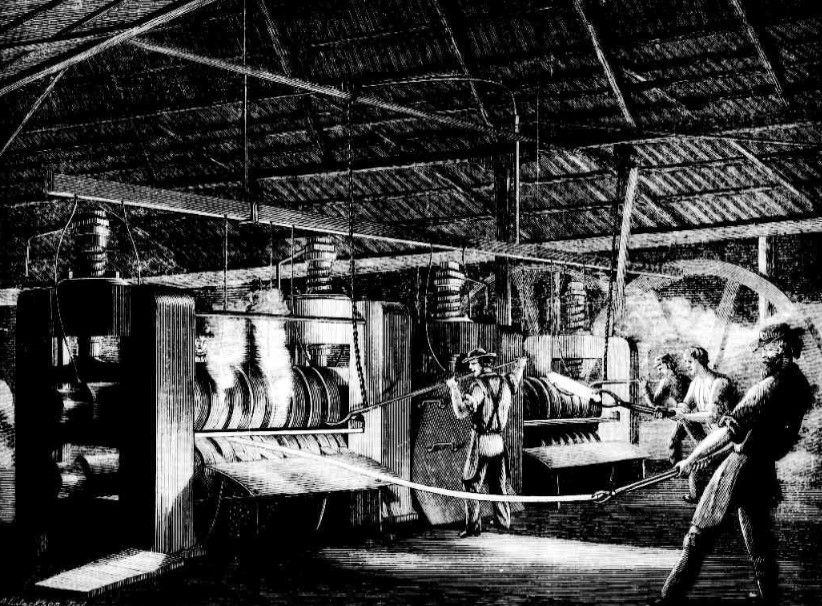
Fitzroy Iron Works - Rolling Mill c.1868. Unknown Artist (Engraving published in Illustrated Sydney News, Thu. 18 Feb. 1869, Page 5).

The "bloom'' of wrought iron created by shingling at the tilt hammer was then passed through the rolls to create 'puddled bars'. This description of the shingling process applies to the engraving of the tilt hammer.

" the tilt hammer at work, and a man in the foreground wheeling a heated pile of puddled bars from the mill furnace to the rolls."

"The puddled balls are successively taken to the tilt hammer, by which the cinder or impurity is squeezed out, and hammered to a convenient shape for passing through the rolls, which draw them out into long flat bars called puddled bars."

This description describes the final rolling operation, in which the 'puddled bars' or are cut into smaller lengths, reheated and rolled to form the final product.

The puddled bars "when cold are cut up into suitable lengths by the shears, piled into oblong blocks, and put into a second furnace, similar in construction to the puddling furnace, called the mill furnace, in which they are brought to a welding heat. The heated piles are then carried to the rolls on a small iron truck and rolled out into merchant bars, &c, the-size and form being regulated by the grooves in the rolls."

This description of the rolling process below applies to the engraving of the rolling mill; cut-up 'puddled bars' were rolled into merchant bar, whereas 'slabs' were rolled into plate.

"Shews the operation of rolling, the same pile into two stages, viz., on the right hand of, the engraving the pile is represented when it is being passed through the first pair or roughing rolls, and on the left hand when it is leaving the second pair or finishing rolls. Different sets of rolls are required for different forms of finished iron, and they are changed accordingly, the form and size of the piles being also regulated to suit the different kind of rolls. In the left hand corner at the foot of the roll standards are two slabs, which is one of the forms into which puddled iron is rolled to produce boiler and other plates."

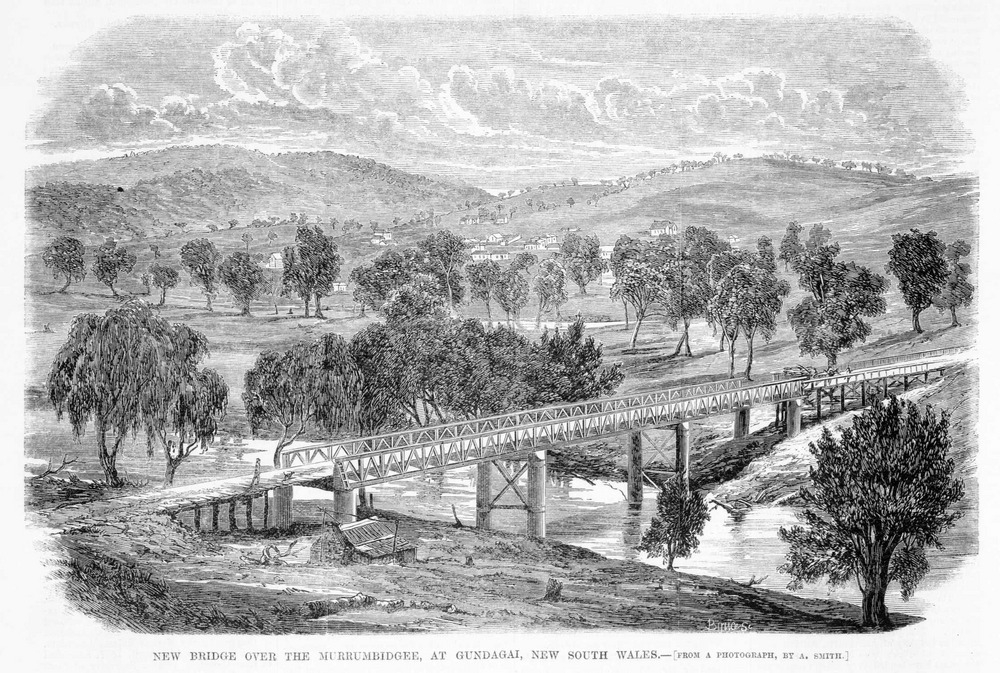
Newly-built Prince Alfred Bridge at Gundagai in 1867.

==== Casting operations (1865–1866) ====
As well as casting the pig-iron into rough 'pigs' for later conversion to wrought iron, the company also carried out casting to manufacture cast-iron items. The foundry and its cupola furnaces were located at the 'top works', adjacent to the blast furnace. The works cast parts for its own machinery, including mill rolls and—its largest casting—a 'sole plate' for the tilt hammer that weighed seven tons.

The company also cast the cylindrical casings for the supporting columns of the Prince Alfred Bridge at Gundagai and cast-iron structural pieces for buildings. Casting operations had ceased by the end of April 1866, and the casting of the last columns for the Gundagai bridge had to be completed by P. N. Russell in Sydney.

==== Brickmaking operations ====
The works made its own bricks from clay quarried on its land. The clay was ground in a 'Chilean mill'. The bricks were needed for repairing the many furnaces at the works.

=== The search for new capital (1870–1872) ===
==== Historical context ====
When the Fitzroy Iron Works were put up for sale at the end of 1869, it seemed like the end for iron-making at Mittagong. Yet, in the early 1870s, conditions had never been better for the prospects of the iron works.

There was a strong demand for iron worldwide, and in Australia there were now many iron-working factories and foundries that were manufacturing iron products, yet most pig-iron and wrought iron was being imported. The New South Wales governments of the period favoured 'free trade' over 'protection' of local industry. The price of imported pig-iron increased, from £4 10s.per ton in 1870 to £9 per ton in 1873, greatly advantaging locally manufactured iron.

The spread of the railway network in New South Wales both increased the demand for rails and made transport faster and cheaper. The railway from Sydney had reached Mittagong in March 1867 and it reached Marulan—where the old company had obtained its limestone—in August 1868.

The blast furnace had been upgraded by Levick, before the works closed in 1869. Although of an antiquated design, it was now significantly more efficient. The puddling furnaces and rolling mills had until recently been in production, and there remained in the Mittagong area at least some of the experienced workforce.

Coal remained a problem to be addressed, but by July 1868, the Cataract Coal Mine, had opened near Berrima, and the company had recognised the potential of its coal seams.

The production of rails for the rapidly expanding railway network was an opportunity, but iron rails were becoming obsolete. Steel rails were more expensive but also more durable. Under the Engineer-in Chief, John Whitton during the 1870s, the N.S.W. railways had begun to use steel rails, which it was necessary to import—mainly from England. Fitzroy's antiquated plant could make wrought iron but not steel, and its production volumes were relatively low. Rail manufacture would require a significant capital expenditure, particularly to make steel by the Bessemer process and roll it into the heavy rails needed by the railways.

It had always been difficult to raise capital for the works within Australia, and this became even harder, after the foreclosure and the failure to sell the works in 1869. In March 1870, there had been an undefended court case to recover the amount owing—£12,452 11s 6d—to the Bank of New South Wales. A meeting had been held to wind up the Fitzroy Iron Works Company in February 1870. If the works were to be restarted, new capital would be needed to clear the company's debts, purchase the assets, and provide working capital.

==== John Frazer ====
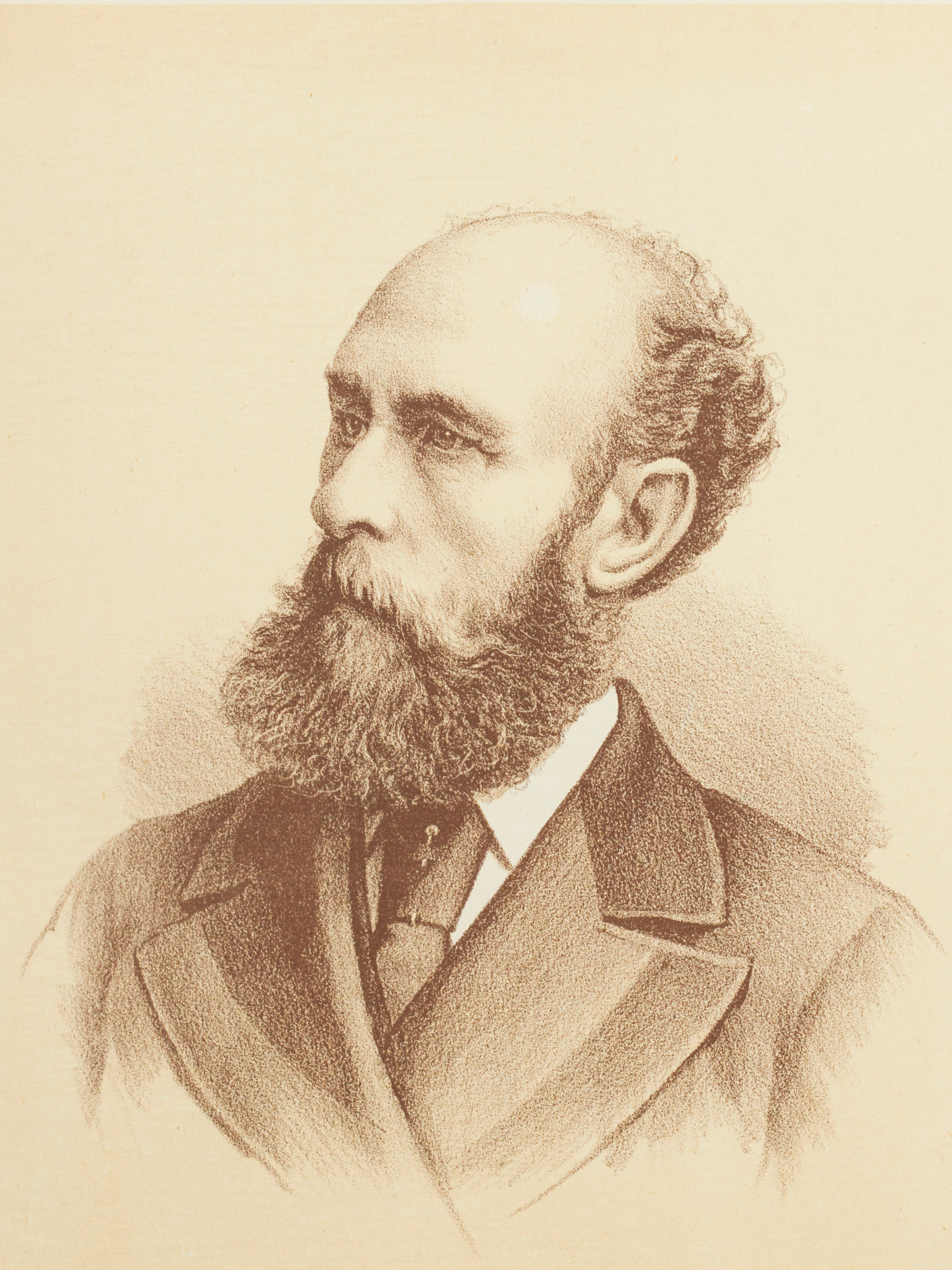
John Frazer

Some of the directors of the old company had not given up on restarting the works. One of them, John Frazer—a wealthy Sydney merchant, company director and philanthropist—was in England, in July 1870, trying to interest English capitalists in investing in the Mittagong works. By August 1870, it was reported that an English company was in the process of being formed. Frazer paid £10,000 to the bank in 1872, clearing the debt. It was reported, in April 1872, that the works had been sold to an English company and that an English manager was on his way.

=== Fitzroy Bessemer Steel, Hematite, Iron and Coal Company (1873–1883) ===
From 1873 to 1883 the works was owned by an English company, Fitzroy Bessemer Steel, Hematite, Iron and Coal Company. The prospectus of the company appeared in April 1873. The vendors of the assets received cash and shares under the deal. In this manner, Ebenezer Vickery, John Frazer and Simon Zöllner retained an interest in the new company, but were not controlling its day-to-day operations.

==== Fitzroy Iron Works c. 1873 ====
The photographs below show external views of both parts of the ironworks, around the time that the new owners assumed control. The original ironworks—with puddling furnaces, tilt hammers and rolling mill—and the later 'Top Works'—with the blast furnace and foundry—were on opposite sides of Iron Mines Creek and were separated by approximately 250 yards. The building that housed the reverberatory furnaces, used in the process of puddling, is the one with two twinned chimneys. Photographs of the rolling mills area of the plant are extremely rare. The photographs are from the collection of the State Library of New South Wales.

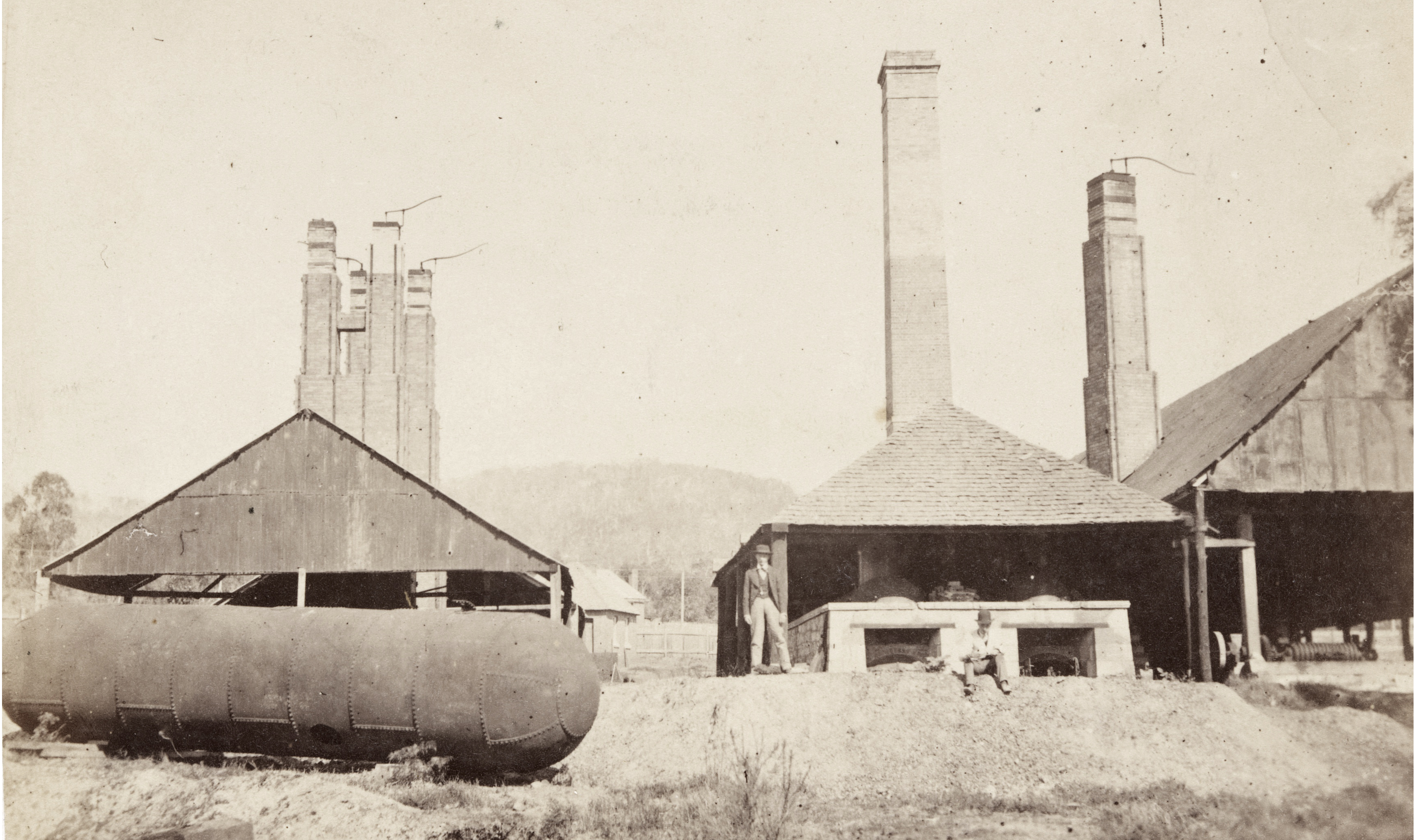
Puddling furnaces and rolling mills, c.1873

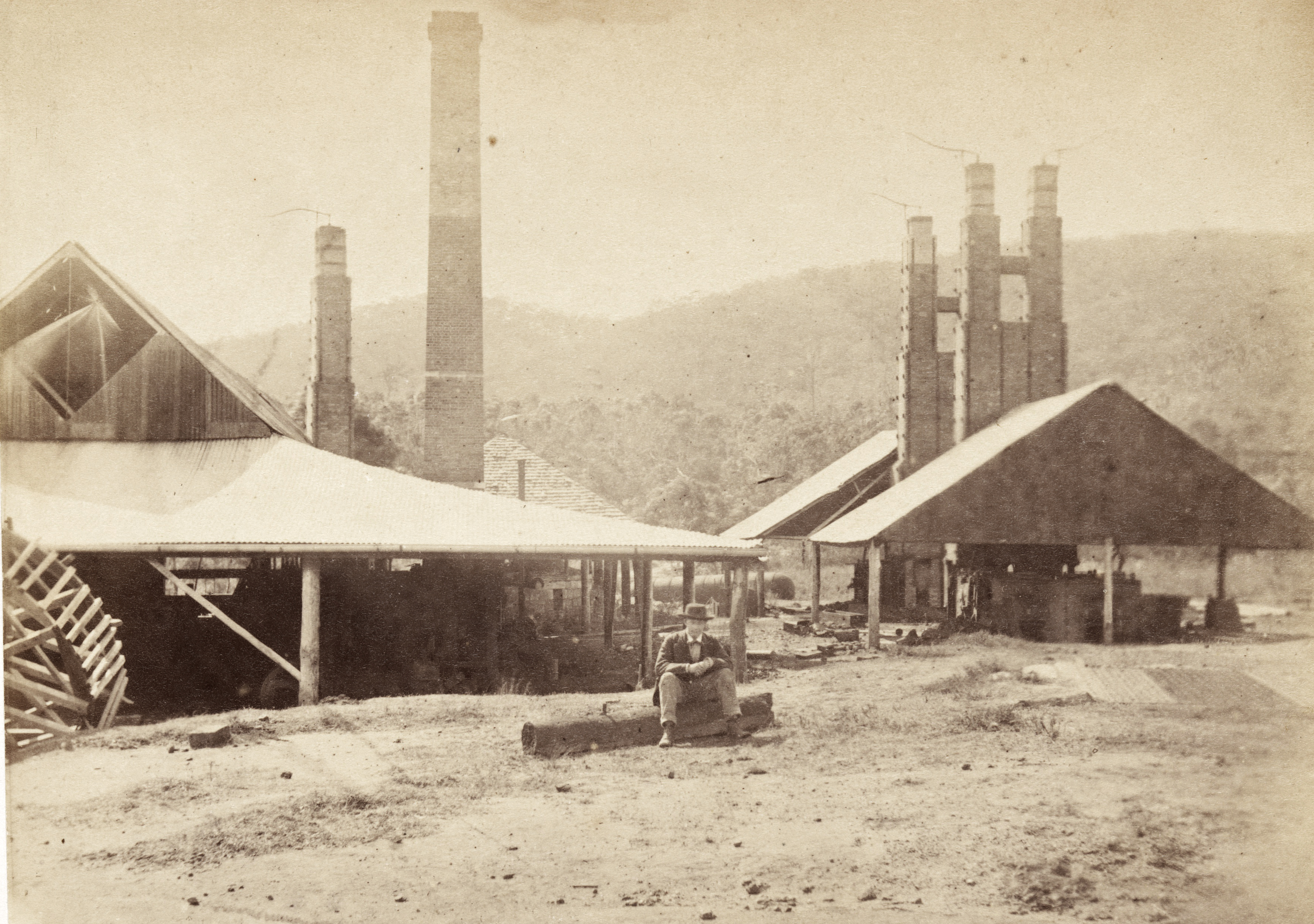
Rolling mills and puddling furnaces c.1873 (viewed from the opposite direction to the photograph on left)

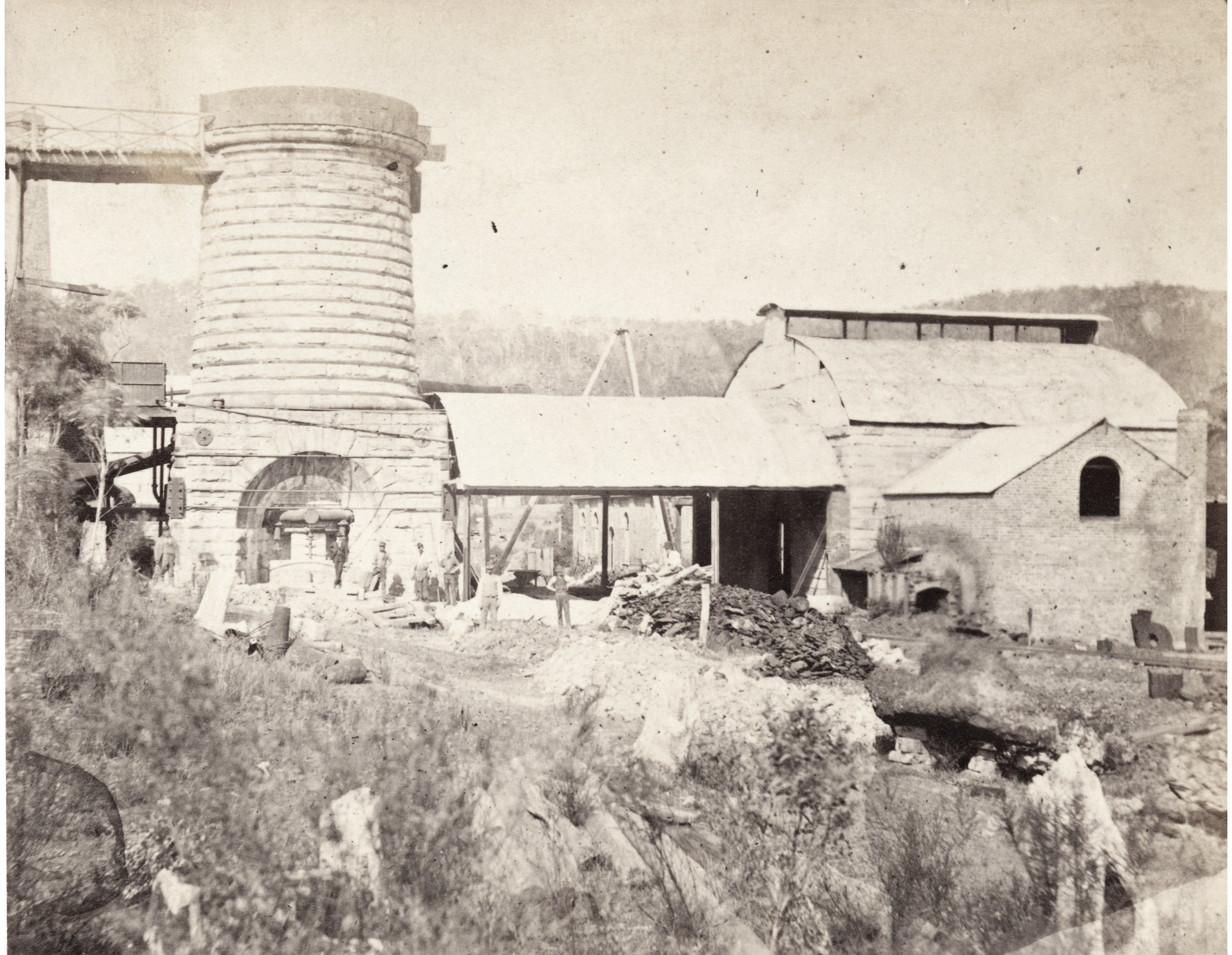
Blast furnace, casting floor, and foundry, c.1873

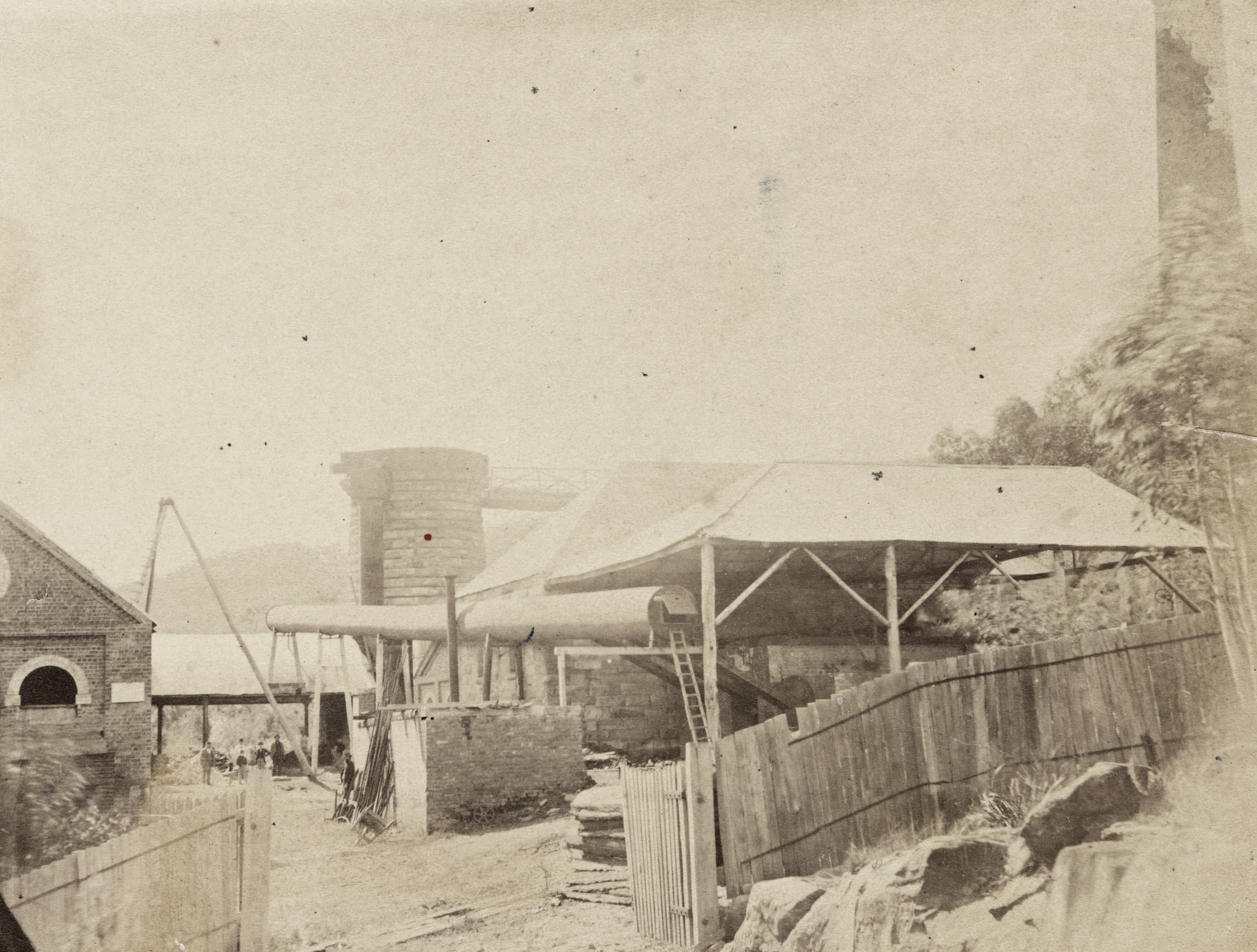
Boiler and blowing equipment building, with blast furnace in the background. c.1873 (viewed from the opposite direction to the photograph on left)

==== David Smith (1873–1875) ====
At the end of July 1873, a new English manager, David Smith, who was also one of the main shareholders, arrived with 15 skilled workers and their families. Almost immediately, there was bad feeling between Smith and his new workforce.

The new company—as implied by its name—had plans to install a Bessemer Convertor to allow it to make steel rails, but did not proceed with it for commercial reasons. Instead Smith tried to make improvements to the existing plant. Smith completed the conversion of the blast furnace to closed-top by adding the 'bell top' and its winding equipment. The dam at Lake Alexandra was also built during the time of Smith's management, to provide water for the works.

Smith set about trying to overcome the difficulties with coking coal that had hampered previous owners. At first, he tried to exploit coal—once again described as 'anthracite'—from Black Bob's Creek but—only after spending £3,000 on a 1¾ mile tramway to the works and winding equipment—found that the coal there was not suitable for the furnace. To run the trial of this coal, the blast furnace was lit again—possibly in late 1873, more probably during 1874—but it was not bought into successful production. A photograph, that has been identified as being taken 'c. 1873', does appear to show the furnace and at least one of its stoves in operation, or at least emitting smoke. Smith stated that he had to add lots of wood to prevent the coal 'choking' the furnace. Like Hampshire before him, he was charging coal—coal that could not form coke—directly into the blast furnace.

In 1874, the company acquired 80 acres of land near Berrima—and access to thick seams of bituminous coking coal—and commenced work on an adit. This new adit mine lay on the opposite side of the gorge to an earlier mine.

Smith and others in the Berrima district then agitated for the Government to fund and construct a tramway from their Berrima mine to Main Southern Line, offering as an inducement cheaper coal for the Government Railways. People from other mining districts viewed this unsympathetically, noting that other mines had supplied their own tramways, and even ports and steamers to carry their coal. The Government's standing policy was that branch lines should be built at the cost of end-users. There was also some surprise that the line was needed at all, after the various managements of the works had for so long praised the quality of the coal on its Mittagong land, only to finally declare it useless for ironmaking.

In October 1875, Smith was complaining bitterly both about the company's "shabby treatment" by the N.S.W. Government—with its failure to build a branch line to the coal mine at Berrima, its purchases of inferior quality imported rails, and its high rates for rail freight—and the large expenditures by the shareholders—£60,000—for no reward. The company had expended much of its English capital, in two and a half years under Smith's management, without being able to enter production. It appears that, about this time, the directors' patience ran out; and a new English manager, David Lawson, took over from Smith in November 1875.

David Smith was still a major shareholder and, as late as April 1877, was still advocating for the branch line to Berrima, which was needed to access less expensive coal.

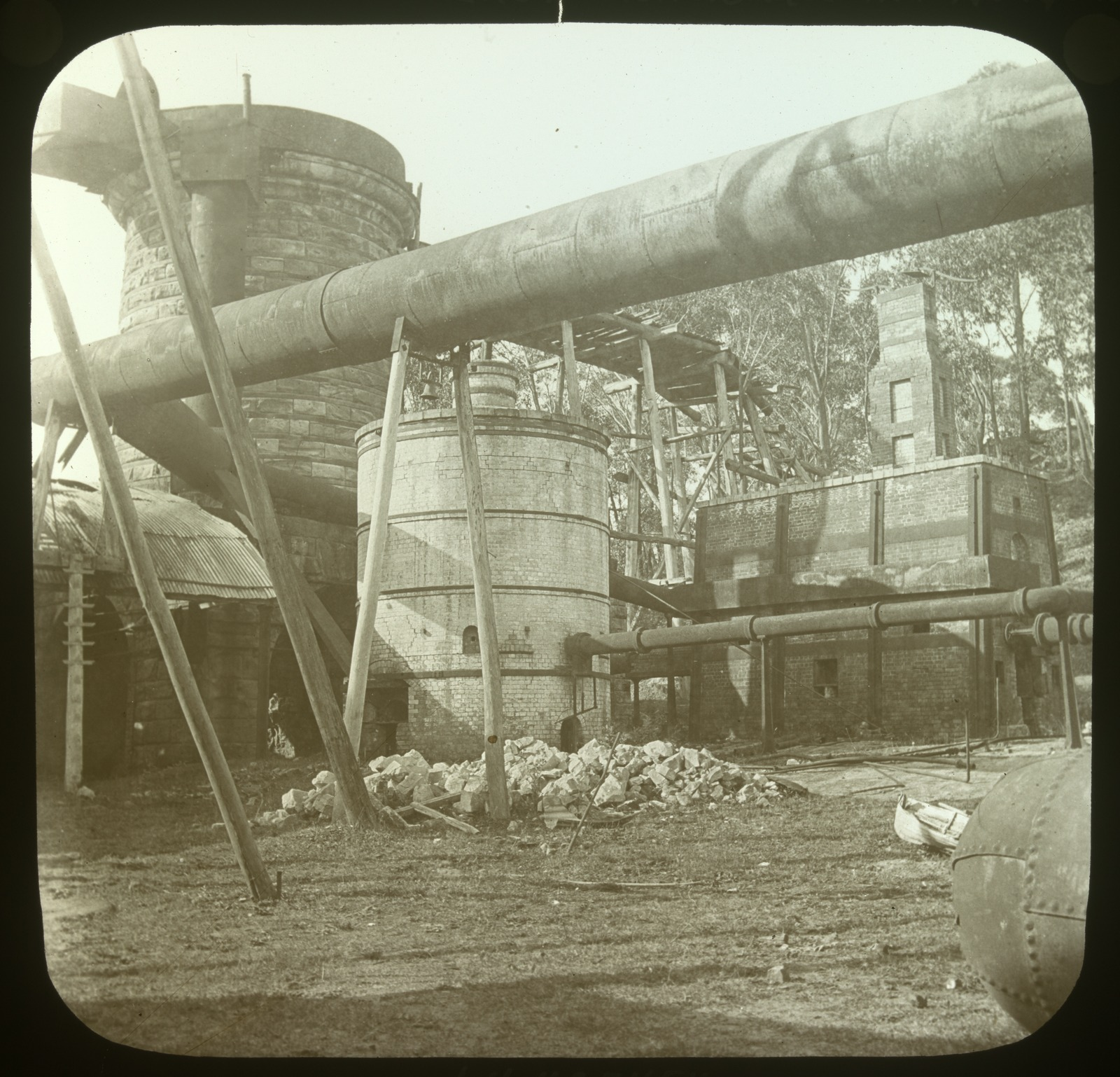
Fitzroy Iron Works, Blast Furnace (Photographer John Henry Harvey 1855–1938, State Library of Victoria). at an unknown date that is after operations ceased (1877), because the gantry to the furnace top is in ruin. The blast furnace is the large sandstone structure on the left. Hampshire's (rectangular) stove and Levick's (cylindrical) stove are shown. The cast house is the roofed structure in the bottom left. The large horizontal pipe and the vertical 'downcomer' pipe carried furnace off-gases, from the furnace top to the boiler-house, to fuel the blast machinery boilers (just out of view on right).

==== David Lawson and iron production (1876 – March 1877) ====
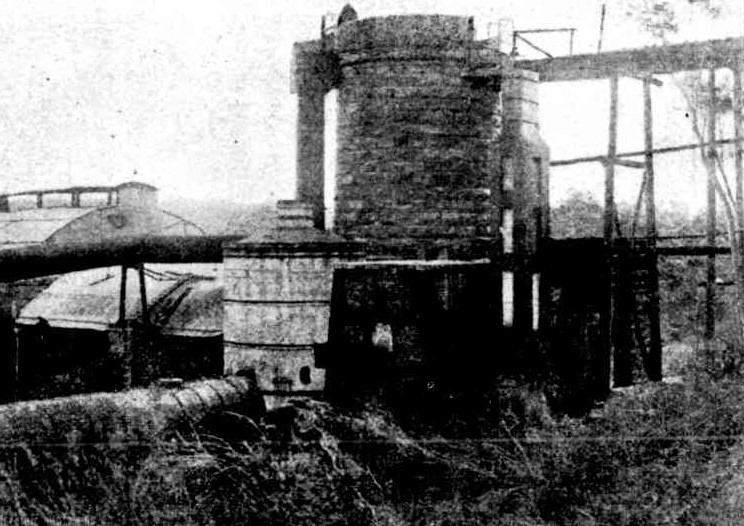
Fitzroy Iron Works - blast furnace, heating stoves, cast house, and gantry, in June 1896. This view is from a different angle to the photograph above. The cast house is the roofed structure on the left, and the foundry is the taller building that is behind it in the left background. (Photographer: Alderman Beaumont of Mittagong. Published in The Sydney Mail and NSW Advertiser, 13 June 1896. Page 1229.

In January 1876, the new manager, David Lawson, was making final preparations to start the blast furnace. The blast furnace began smelting iron on 5 February 1876. With the benefit of the earlier modifications by Levick—particularly the addition of the second 'stove'—and the closed-top conversion started by Levick and completed by Smith, the blast furnace was producing around 100 tons per week of pig-iron from the outset and soon reached 120 tons per week.

The blast furnace was using coke made from Bulli coal. The quality of the coke is critical to blast furnace operation, and the Bulli coal was a premium coking coal. There were no coke ovens at the works. The coal was coked by setting it on fire, on the hill-top near the furnace, in open heaps that were covered by the ashes of previous batches. This was a wasteful process, as it did not allow the coke oven gas that is generated during coking in an oven to be used as a fuel.

There was no rail connection to Bulli, so the coal was carried by ship from the Bulli Jetty to Sydney, where it was transshipped to rail wagons at the Pyrmont coal wharves and sent to Mittagong. The same coal seams as Bulli passed under Mittagong but at a depth of over 600 feet. These seams were also exposed in the Wingecaribee River gorge near Berrima, where Smith had started work on the mine. There had been agitation by Smith and others in 1874 and 1875 to build a short rail line from the Berrima mine site to the Main Southern Line. The first Berrima Railway Line was built and privately funded, but not until 1881, long after the works had closed. In 1876–1877, this left the works reliant upon coal carried all the way from either Bulli or Bowenfels, which made the coal very expensive. Unfortunately, although Berrima mine was eventually opened, in 1881 by the Berrima Coal Mining and Railway Company, the closure of the iron-works, would rob the mine of a potential large local customer and, after it lost its contract with the Victorian Railways in 1889, the mine too closed.

In April 1876, the works was forced to shut down due to a water shortage; the works required a large amount of water for cooling and to raise steam.

The company was advertising its pig-iron, in June 1876, and quoting testimonial letters from Sydney foundries praising its quality. In September 1876, the plant was producing iron, but the rolling mills were not working—once again due to poor foundations—and would be costly to get running. The mills were also insufficiently powered for the rolling of large rails. Lawson had the rolling mills rebuilt in November 1876 and recruited experienced rollers from England, but by the time the works closed—in March 1877—the mills had produced only 52 tons of iron bars.

The economics of the works relied upon producing higher-priced finished iron products (bar, plate or rails), rather than ordinary pig-iron, which —compared to its high price in 1873—had become relatively cheap as an import (carried as ballast in sailing ships to Australia). The cost of transporting pig-iron from Mittagong to Sydney by rail was about the same as transporting imported pig-iron from England, making the sale of Fitzroy pig-iron in Sydney essentially unprofitable. Lawson was later to attribute the price problem to the high cost of coking coal at Mittagong (20 shillings per ton), which contributed 60 shillings (£3) to the cost of a ton of iron, for the fuel alone.

Around this time, local competition first became a factor; by 1876, commercial quantities of pig-iron had been made at Lithgow N.S.W., Lal Lal in Victoria, and at Middle Arm and Redbill Point on the River Tamar in Tasmania.

In the year 1876, New South Wales produced 2,679 tons of pig-iron valued at £13,399, the "bulk of this iron is from the Fitzroy iron-works". However, the small and antiquated iron-works could not compete with imported pig-iron, and iron smelting ceased on 16 March 1877.

The blast furnace had produced 3,273 tons in the previous nine months, but never produced pig-iron again. There was a stockpile of unsold pig-iron left on site when the works closed.

==== Larkin, Hunter and Henshaw (1877–1878) ====
Three partners Larkin, Hunter and Henshaw bought up the unsold pig-iron and leased the works in late 1877. They puddled the leftover pig-iron and rolled merchant bars. Hunter and Henshaw left in January 1878. Edward G. Larkin—who had put capital into the venture—continued the business, until he had completed a contract to supply the Joadja oil shale mine with 50 tons of light (45 pound per yard) wrought-iron rails for a narrow-gauge tramway from Mittagong to Joadja. At the end of these operations, 106 tons of Fitzroy puddled iron was shipped to the Eskbank Ironworks at Lithgow. This was the last of the iron smelted and puddled at the works.

==== Larkin and Jeavons (1879-1880) ====
Edward Larkin was the first to mine the Mittagong limonite ore for town gas purification, in 1879.

Larkin became involved in an attempt by David Jeavons (formerly of the firm John Brown & Co. of Sheffield) to make steel at the Fitzroy works. These experiments, using a process involving hydrogen gas, ended around 4:30 p.m.on 5 October 1880, when a gas explosion killed Jeavons instantly and injured Larkin. It was reported Jeavons had funded the experimental work himself and had been on the verge of success. His newly-married wife had only arrived at Nattai (Mittagong), on the evening before his death.

Larkin continued an association with the then dormant works. He was later employed by William Sandford and by the Mittagong Land Company.

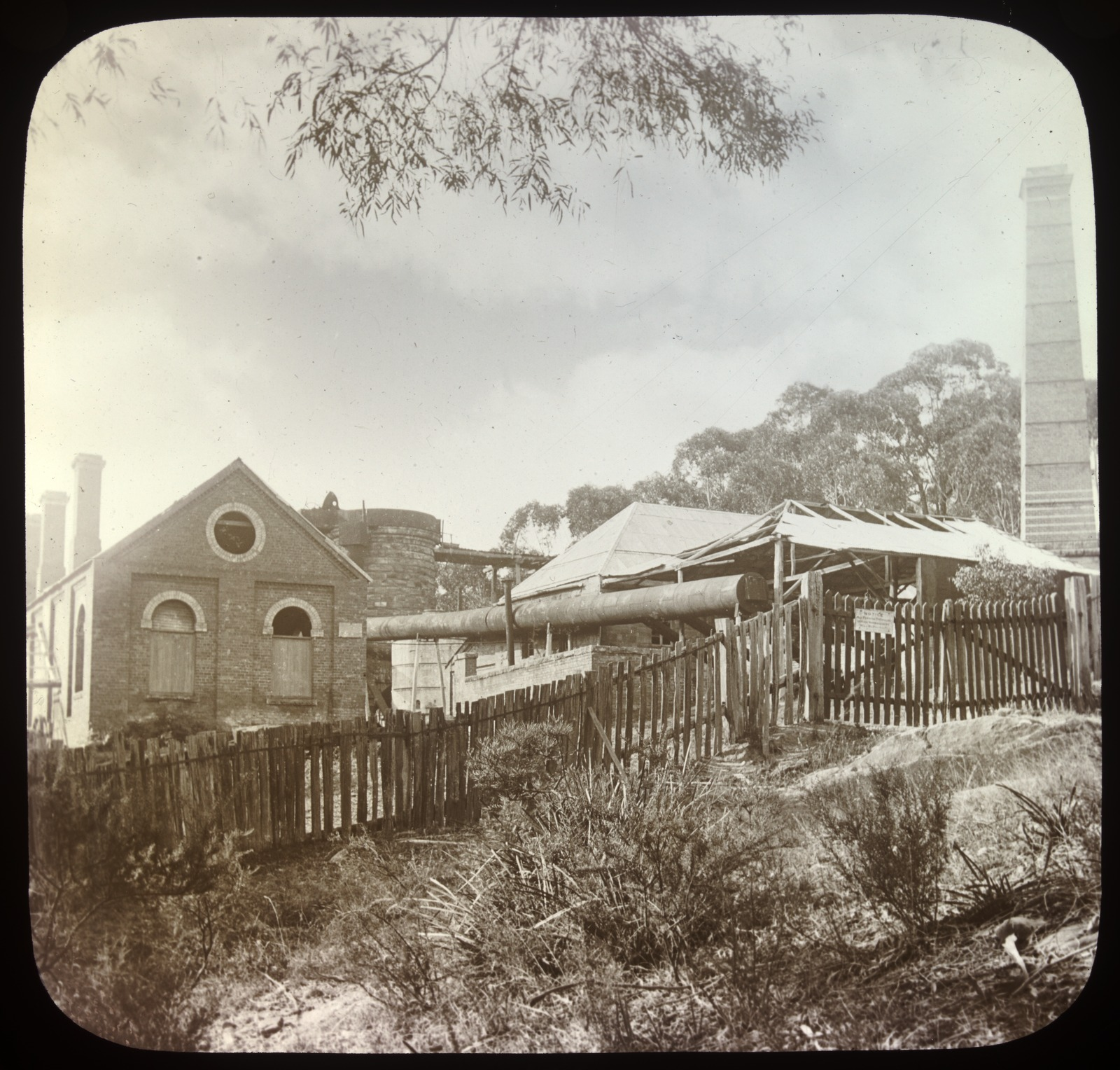
Fitzroy Iron Works - Blast furnace area known as the 'Top works', in dilapidated condition, unknown date between 1877 and 1913. (Photographer John Henry Harvey 1855–1938, State Library of Victoria)

=== Mittagong Land Company and the final years (1883–1910) ===
The 1,600 acre landholding—and with it the old plant—was sold to a new venture, The Mittagong Land Company, in 1883, for £27,100. The purchase also included the 40 acres of the limestone quarry at Marulan. The new company retained the iron works intact but were focussed on the sale of the land. The first land sale took place in 1884.

While working for the Mittagong Land Company, in 1884, Edward Larkin improved the recreational facilities at the Chalybeate Spring, which lay on the company's land, and added a pipe to allow visitors to more easily obtain its water.

The company sought coal on the property, realising that if coal were found, there might be a prospect of interesting other parties in taking on the iron mine and the iron works. A 14 feet thick intersection with seams of good coking coal was found—at a bore depth of 657 feet—by diamond drilling on the property in 1887, although an attempt to sink a shaft to these seams failed due to water inflow in 1893. The long sought coking coal was there on the company's land, after all, but it could not be mined.

The company also sunk some shafts into the iron ore in 1888, probably to assess the size of the deposit.

Various parties leased the works from the Mittagong Land Company or experimented with iron-making at Mittagong between 1886 and 1910.

==== William Sandford (1886–1887) ====
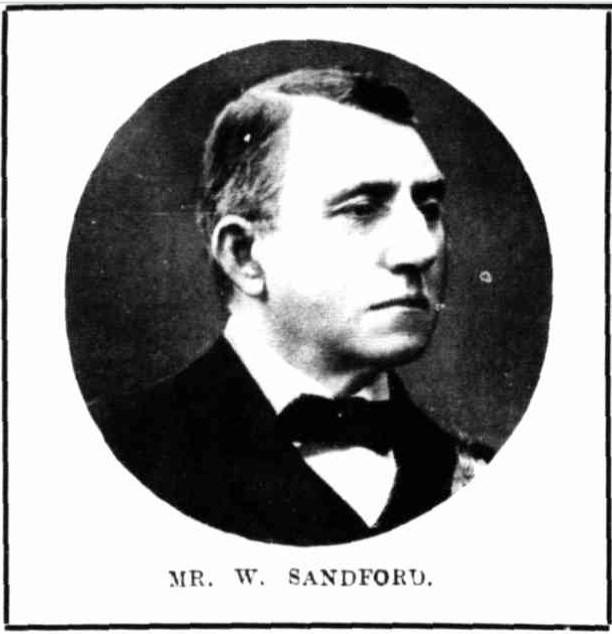
William Sandford in 1906, Unknown Photographer, (Published in The Sydney Mail and New South Wales Advertiser, Sat. 13 Oct. 1906 Page 54)

William Sandford took a lease on the iron works in March 1886—in order to re-roll scrapped iron rails under a contract to the NSW Government that he shared with the Eskbank Iron Works at Lithgow.

Sandford engaged Enoch Hughes as his manager—for the first four months—and Larkin as his engineer. Production commenced in August 1886. Around September 1886, he also made galvanised iron sheet.

Sandford may have envisaged restarting the blast furnace, because he bought a blowing cylinder and its bedplate from the old blast furnace at the Eskbank Ironworks, in October 1886, although he did not install it.

The rolling mill at Mittagong proved underpowered to roll the heavy rails ordered under the contract. After nine months and reportedly expending around £1,500, Sandford relocated the work to the Eskbank Ironworks. This ended production at the Fitzroy Iron Works; there would never be any saleable iron product made there after 1887.

Sandford was more successful at Lithgow, at least initially. It became the first integrated iron and steel works in Australia, under Sandford's ownership and management. He is viewed as the father of the modern iron and steel industry in Australia.

==== Brazenall and Son (1889) ====
William Brazenall was a blacksmith and one of the skilled workers brought by the company in 1873 to Mittagong, where he had clashed with the works manager David Smith. He left the works and set up a blacksmith's shop on Gibbergunyah Hill, at Mittagong in 1875. In 1889, he and his son, William Brazenall, Junior, experimented with the production of iron pipes from Mittagong iron ore. They were assisted initially by Joseph Rowley, who came up from Victoria. Rowley had blast furnace experience at the Tamar Hematite Iron Co. and later the Lal Lal blast furnace. Working from their small premises on a hill nearby to the old works at Mittagong, they were only interested in the iron ore deposit—and other deposits that they had identified in the surrounding area—and not in restarting the Fitzroy Iron Works. They smelted the iron ore in a small blast furnace—capable of smelting 5 cwt of iron, and which they had made themselves with Rowley's assistance—tapped the molten iron into a ladle and then poured it into a pipe mould. They had produced pig-iron and successfully cast it to make a sample pipe—nine feet long and four inches in diameter. They had also cast some 'pigs'.

Their initial experiments were made with charcoal as the fuel and reducing agent but a little later they had used the 'anthracite' coal of Mittagong directly charged to the furnace without coking.

Plans to set up a company to exploit the ore led to two public demonstrations of pipe casting, a public meeting about a float, and the exhibiting of samples at the London Mining Exhibition of 1891. The timing was bad, as Australia was just entering its economic depression of the 1890s and imported pig-iron was duty-free before 1893. The failure to set up the company caused William Brazenall, Sen. to leave Mittagong in disappointment. While in Sydney in 1891, he was involved in experiments with the production of iron from Tasmanian ore. He was bankrupt in 1894, but continued to be inventive and made applications for patents.

William Brazenall, Jun., remained in Mittagong and set up a successful foundry business in Princes Street, which made cast-iron lamp posts, verandah posts and iron lacework for buildings; some of these castings survive in the district today.

==== End of the Fitzroy Bessemer Steel, Hematite, Iron and Coal Company (1893) ====
In 1893, the long-dormant Fitzroy Bessemer Steel, Hematite, Iron and Coal Company was dissolved; by then, its shares were worthless.

==== Alfred Lambert and 'Lambert Brothers' (1896) ====
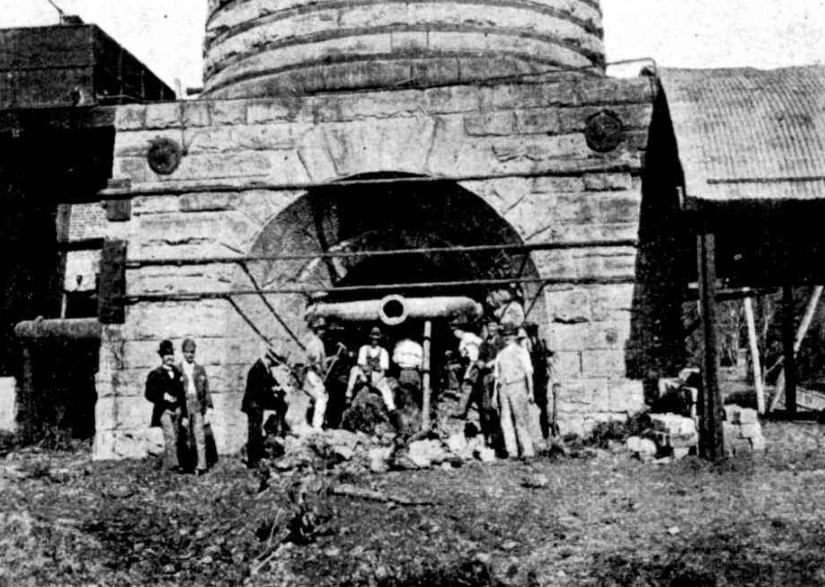
Fitzroy Iron Works - The base of the blast furnace, when it was being cleaned out in 1896. Photograph by Alderman Beaumont of Mittagong. (From 'The Sydney Mail and New South Wales Advertiser', Sat. 13 Jun. 1896, Page 1229.) The well-dressed man first on the left is thought to be Alfred Lambert. The photographer was later one of the three magistrates who sentenced Lambert to 11-weeks' gaol in September 1896.

In 1896, a company known as 'Lambert Brothers' (claiming an association with a firm of 'Lambert and Sons, of Middlesbrough, England') were attracted to New South Wales by the prospect of a large government contract for 150,000 tons of steel rails to be made locally. Alfred Lambert stated that he had discussions with Sir George Dibbs, during the then premier's visit to London—in June 1892—and that Dibbs had strongly encouraged him to set up operations in New South Wales.

Lambert took up residence in Mittagong in April 1896, and took out a lease—of 21-year term—on the ironworks property. It was reported that a branch line to the works would be built, as soon as agreement could be obtained from the Railway Commissioners.

It was reported, in May 1896, that 'Lambert Brothers' was owned by a 150 year-old firm with a world wide reputation, that "the rumor of the works are about to be reopened and conducted upon a scale never before attempted is perfectly true", and that new machinery was being manufactured in England. It was confidently predicted that, "There is no possibility of failure this time." Lambert predicted that the works would be employing a thousand men by January 1897, and it was reported that the works could be exporting its products to other counties such as "China, Japan, the Straits Settlement, North and South America, the Transvaal, and elsewhere." Moreover, all this was to be done—in sympathy with the free-trade policy of Premier George Reid's government— "without any assistance from the State in the form of bonus or protective duty."

It is not immediately obvious why a British industrialist seeking to make large quantities of steel rails would make the choice of the derelict and obsolete ironworks, even though it did possess high quality iron ore and—by then—potentially also coal. Indeed, some people in the district had suspicions that all was not as it seemed, but they were dismissed as naysayers. Some newspaper articles of the time criticised Mittagong as a site for a steelworks—on logistical and economic grounds—and questioned the viability of the 'Lambert Brothers' venture without protection against imports.

By June 1896, Alfred Lambert had negotiated use of the Fitzroy Iron Works. Lambert stated that he had secured additional sources of iron ore for blending with the local ore, was sinking a shaft for coal, and making other preparations at the site, including cleaning out the old blast furnace. The old blast furnace would be put to use to smelt pig-iron but would also be used to melt down the plant's obsolete equipment, in readiness for the new machinery. Smoke was seen from the chimneys by mid-June and the workers received their first pay packets on 13 June 1896. However, work ceased abruptly on 1 July 1896. Albert Lambert wrote a letter to the Minister of Works setting out objections to the conditions of the rail contract and effectively withdrew, some months before 'Lambert Brothers' tender offer and those of other tenderers were due. 'Lambert Brothers' never did resume work at the Fitzroy Iron Works.

The closure was sudden and unexpected; so much so that, in nearby Joadja, on the Saturday evening following the closure, the residents made a presentation to Mr Alexander Russell of "an illuminated address, a pipe, and a purse of sovereigns", as he left his job of 17 years as mine manager at Joadja "to take the management for Lambert Brothers at the Fitzroy Iron Mines at Mittagong."

Money, or lack of it, was—yet again—a factor in the end of operations at the ironworks. On 1 September 1896, Mr Alfred Lambert “was committed to Berrima gaol for neglecting to pay wages for which verdicts were recently given against him in 11 cases. The wages were owing in connection with the Fitzroy Iron Works which Mr. Lambert started a few months ago, but stopped working.” He was given eleven weeks' gaol. A cheque he had written in July 1896 was dishonoured, resulting in a charge of obtaining money by false pretences. He had left bills unpaid. He could not pay his creditors and the wages that he owed and was soon a bankrupt.

His bankruptcy hearing began, on 19 November 1896, after his release from Berrima Gaol. In evidence, Lambert claimed to be the son of Henry Lambert, a former member of the House of Commons for County Wexford. That relationship seems unlikely. Henry Lambert had died in 1861, aged 75, and Lambert claimed to be under forty years of age at the time of his bankruptcy hearing. Henry Lambert's two legitimate sons were far older, and his illegitimate son was older still. One legitimate son—his heir—had died June 1896, and the younger legitimate son was 69 years old; the older, illegitimate son would have been around ninety years old, if still alive in 1896. None of Lambert's three known sons had names of Alfred or John. Such an Irish background, also was at apparent variance with his earlier story of being associated with a firm of 'Lambert and Sons, of Middlesbrough, England'.

Lambert gave detailed but seemingly implausible evidence about his education, career, and personal wealth. However, after that first day, the hearing was delayed by Lambert's unexpected absence, and a warrant was issued for his arrest.

When he next appeared in court, it was while in custody under a writ of habeas corpus. Alfred John Lambert gave bizarre evidence at the public examination that was part of his bankruptcy hearing, in March 1897. He estimated his liabilities at £1,175 and his assets at £438,312, principally consisting of a landed estate in England. He said that he would inherit £400,000 or £500,000 from his uncle, upon reaching the age of 40, and that his mother had 'considerable property'. Lambert claimed that his ironworks venture was backed by Baron Hirsch—one of the five wealthiest individuals in Europe at the time of his death in April 1896—and that he had brought £2,000 of Hirsch's money to Australia in a belt. He claimed that he left England with letters of introduction from Baron Hirsch and Colonel North—another immensely wealthy man known as 'The King of Nitrates', who had died in May 1896—but he had lost those letters on the way out.

In his evidence, he recalled his interview about the ironworks, with George Reid, the Premier, during which he stated his intention to have a capacity to make about 500 tons of steel rails per week. He also admitted that there was no such company as 'Lambert Brothers'—something that he had not mentioned during his discussion with the Premier—but stated that he would have set one up had he won the rail contract. He stated that he had written to his brother, George, "at Biarritz and Rome and Monte Carlo" but received no reply. A son of Henry Lambert, George Thomas Lambert did exist, but was the "Director of the estates and finances of Greenwich Hospital, 1885—1901".

There were also 40 debentures of £500 each in the non-existent English company. It seems that Lambert had attempted to sell debentures in Sydney. Lambert stated that he had advertised debentures in two Sydney newspapers but had failed to sell any, he said, because his two rich backers had died. He admitted to—in February 1897—living under a false name—Alfred Wilson—and, while a bankrupt, taking out a lease and misrepresenting himself as an agent of another non-existent company. He was already, by the date of his public examination hearing, in custody under a committal for obtaining money under false pretences.—All this suggested a pattern of criminal behaviour.—Lambert also stated that he had received an injury to his head in a railway accident.

The following day's session of the public examination heard more of Lambert's bizarre evidence, of his earlier accidents, injuries, a case of sunstroke and his being in a "trance for three weeks" after an accident. Lambert represented his discussion with Premier George Reid concerning the ironworks—to which Reid had made reference in his budget speech to the N.S.W. Parliament—as only being "a political argument" on a train, when he had "met Reid on the station as a perfect stranger". Such a representation, apparently, was inconsistent with his own evidence given on just the previous day. Lambert was described as a "monomaniac" but he stated that he "had never been detained anywhere for any affliction of the brain", while at the same time giving strange and implausible evidence as if delusional. More evidence was given concerning the non-existent company, 'Lambert Brothers'; Lambert's ironworks venture was described, aptly, as "a gigantic swindle".

Alfred Lambert was possibly a fantasist and almost certainly a confidence-artist. Lambert was not an industrialist and there was no 'Lambert Brothers', but he had taken in and deceived the N.S.W. Government—and Premier George Reid— the local press, his unpaid employees, and creditors. He had played his role convincingly. Lambert's actions seem to have been steps in an elaborate and sophisticated 'confidence trick', which—had he sold his bogus debentures— could have succeeded.

Lambert had used a background story that almost certainly was based upon newspaper reports—published between 1890 and 1895—of the efforts of Joseph Mitchell to form a syndicate of English capitalists, set up an iron and steel works, and win the steel-rail contract. Mitchell had been apparently the sole contender in negotiations for the work, until Lambert's involvement—and his convincing assurances of the capabilities of 'Lambert Brothers'—caused the government to break off negotiations with Mitchell, and open a competitive tender process for the steel-rails contract. Sadly, although Mitchell eventually did win the contract, he died before he could fulfil it.

Lambert—described as "a man of very gentlemanly appearance"— was acquitted, on 4 June 1897, in a jury trial, of a charge of false pretences relating to a dishonoured cheque. The result was announced by telegraph; "Case just finished. Lambert discharged, to everyone's surprise." Consequently, except for the 11-weeks' imprisonment served for not paying wages, Lambert avoided punishment for his time at Mittagong. He prudently kept away from public view after his acquittal.

==== Daniel Flood (1904–1910) ====
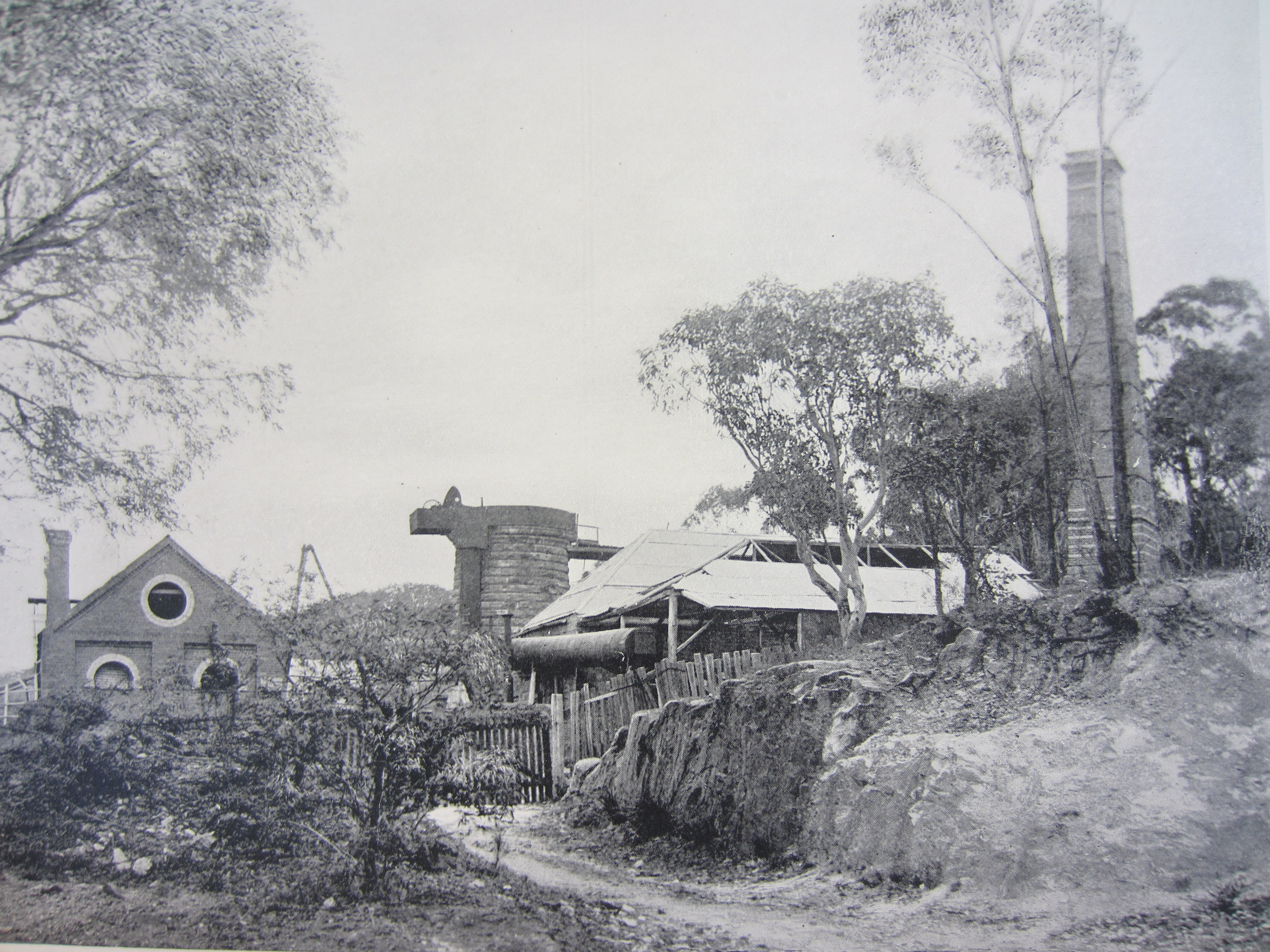
Fitzroy Iron Works - 'Top works' or blast furnace area, in or earlier than 1901, showing the structures as they were before the partial demolition work of 1904. Reproduced from 'The Iron Ore Deposits of NSW' by J.B.Jacquet, published in 1901. Photograph is credited to 'L.F.H. Photo' (Unknown Photographer).

In the very last attempt to revive the works, a Sydney company, 'Flood and Co.', bought the machinery and buildings in 1904. It was reported that they “before dismantling are endeavouring to form a company to start the works”. The man behind these developments, Daniel Flood, seems to have been a shady character, with an argumentative personality. Old equipment was being removed in November 1904 and Flood was seriously injured during the demolition work.

Reports state that new equipment was erected at the plant by early August 1910, with an expectation that “the raw material will be converted into pig iron by a new process, and other foundry work carried on.” It seems that Flood's smelting process would have reused the old blast furnace structure, but substituted the stoves for pipes running on each side of the furnace. During August 1910, Flood stated that this arrangement had been tested, and that smelting would start in a few days, and, in September, he successfully tendered to mine iron ore near the mineral spring. However, in October, Flood, while still stating that his "patent" had been a success, was awaiting more new equipment to arrive in December 1910 to start production, including a larger, 30-horsepower, blowing engine. These plans apparently came to nothing. In the meantime, Australia's first modern blast furnace had commenced operation at the Lithgow in May 1907.

The last heard of Daniel Flood and his iron smelting efforts was in 1918; he wrote, from Leichhardt, requesting the Mittagong Council not to remove any more slag from the iron works site, as he claimed that it was his property. His letter was ignored.

=== After the Iron Works ===
From around 1879 and well into the 20th century, limonite iron ore was quarried at Mittagong and was used to remove hydrogen sulphide in the process of town gas purification. In February 1920, Michael Cosgrove took out a licence to search for iron and coal on 22 acres of land owned by the Mittagong Land Company. He intended to work the old iron mine again, probably to quarry limonite for gas purification.

The blast furnace structure was demolished in 1922 (some sources say, incorrectly, in 1927) but the surrounding buildings were gone by 1913.

The Mittagong Land Company went into voluntary liquidation in 1924—a process still ongoing in 1934— bringing the long story of the Fitzroy Iron Works and its various owners to an end.

In 1941, iron ore was briefly mined again at Mittagong for iron-making, but this time it was for Port Kembla steelworks.

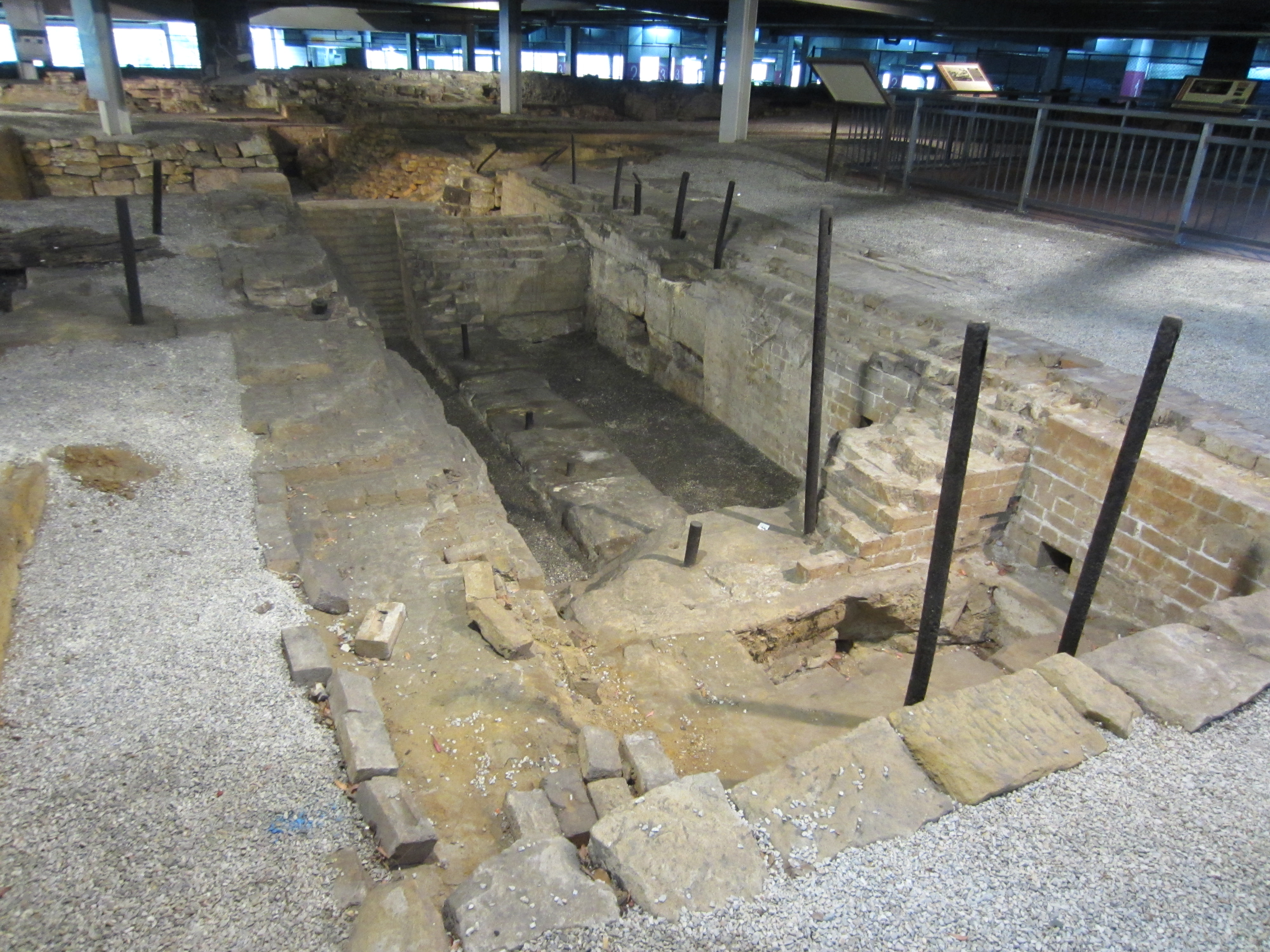
Some of the remnants of the Fitzroy Iron Works (Oct. 2018)

== Relic re-discovery ==
The site of the blast furnace had always been known but the existence of remains of the original iron works—the site of the puddling furnaces, tilt hammers and rolling mills—was not.

During excavation work for a new Woolworths store in 2004, the remains of the Iron Works were found.

The site was excavated and researched, and the new development was expanded to incorporate the historic artifacts. The displays are viewable in the underground car park area. Two stone rolls from the Chilean mill—used to grind clay—are also on display. Unfortunately, some other relics from the ironworks site were misplaced, removed, or otherwise lost, by 2018.

== Legacy and remnants ==
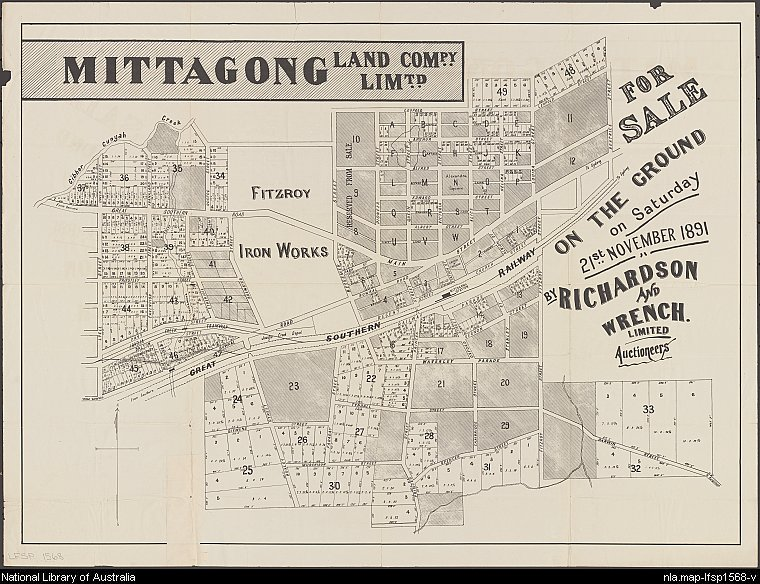
Map of land sale at Mittagong in 1891. The area once called 'New Sheffield' is to the right of area shown as the Fitzroy Iron Works.

In 1887, it was said of the Fitzroy Iron Works that, "The complete failure which has attended each and every effort is at least remarkable; and the amount of money that has been lost over the mines is next to appalling. There the works stand to-day in dreary solitude, frigidly, heartlessly, sullenly, as it were, betokening the wealth, ingenuity, knowledge, labour, and skill which they have overcome and shattered [sic] to the winds." Nonetheless, aside from its undeniable failure as a business venture, the works left other legacies.

The Fitzroy Iron Works led to the growth of the town of Mittagong and, in particular, the part of that town once known as "New Sheffield". Building allotments in 'New Sheffield' were sold by the company in 1865, to provide additional funds, due to the difficulty in raising capital. During the time that the iron works land was owned by the Mittagong Land Company, more building allotments were sold.

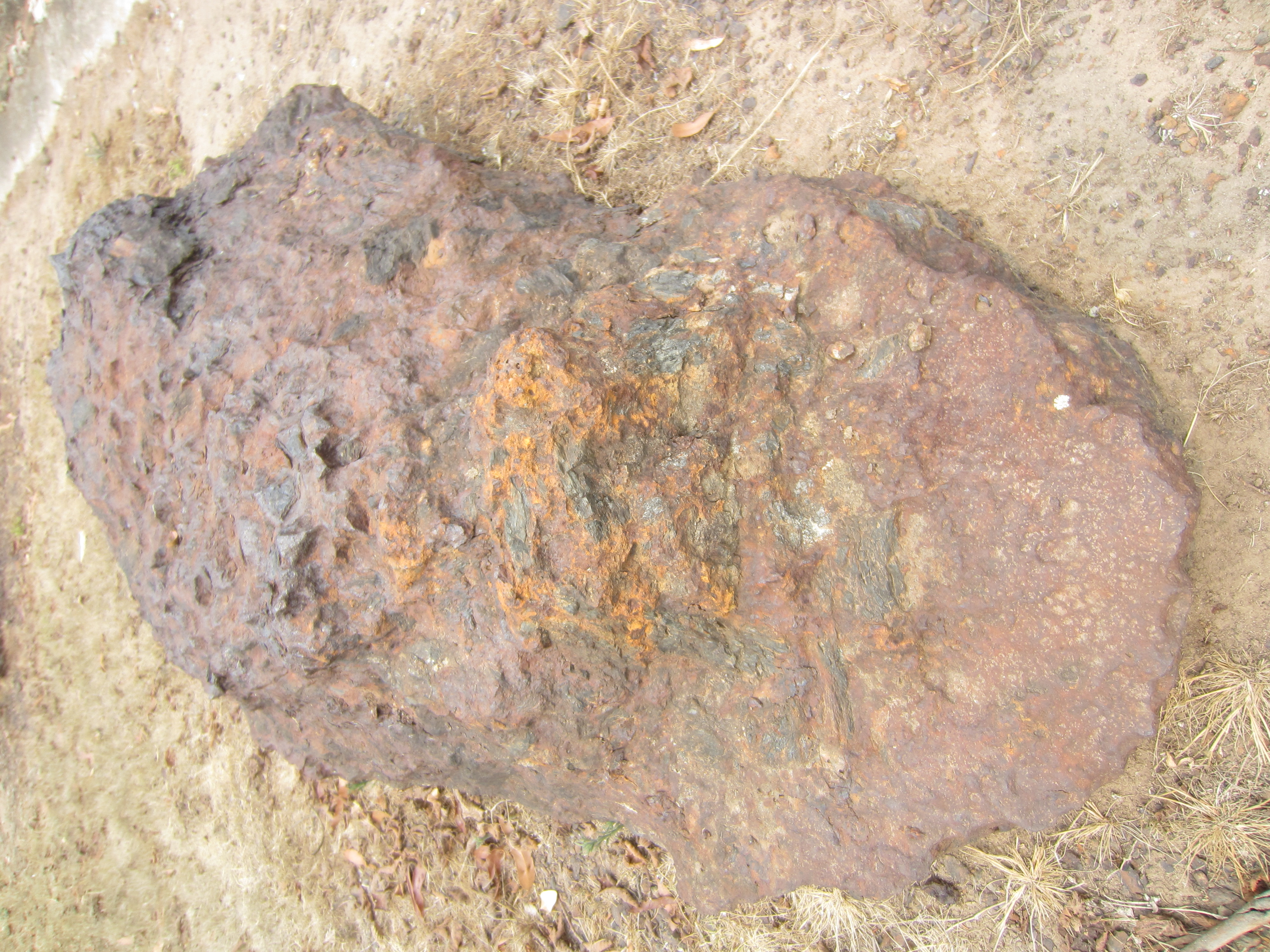
One of four 'Bosh skull' fragments at the site of the former blast furnace. Pieces of coal are visible, as inclusions within the iron. (January 2020)

The name of Bessemer Street in this area of the township recalls the iron-making past of Mittagong, as do Ironmines Oval and Iron Mines Creek, both of which lie between the sites of the original iron works and the blast furnace. Also located within the area formerly known as 'New Sheffield' is Lake Alexandra, a man-made lake that was originally built by the Fitzroy Iron Works.

The lion is the symbol of Mittagong and of its public school. Some of Mittagong's sporting teams are known as the Mittagong Lions and use the lion as their symbol. The particular design used most commonly—known as the 'Fitzroy lion'—is very similar to that of the commemorative doorstops cast at the Fitzroy Iron Works in 1850. One of the original 'Fitzroy lion' doorstops is on display at the Mittagong RSL Club.

At the site of the former blast furnace, there are a drain and the blast machinery foundation, both cut into the solid sandstone bedrock. Nothing remains of the furnace structure itself.

Also at the blast furnace site, there are four rough pieces of rusty iron, which are almost certainly fragments of a "bosh skull" from the old furnace. Two of these pieces of iron have, as inclusions within their structure, large pieces of coal—possibly the result of an attempt to smelt iron using poor-quality local coal instead of coke (refer to photograph).

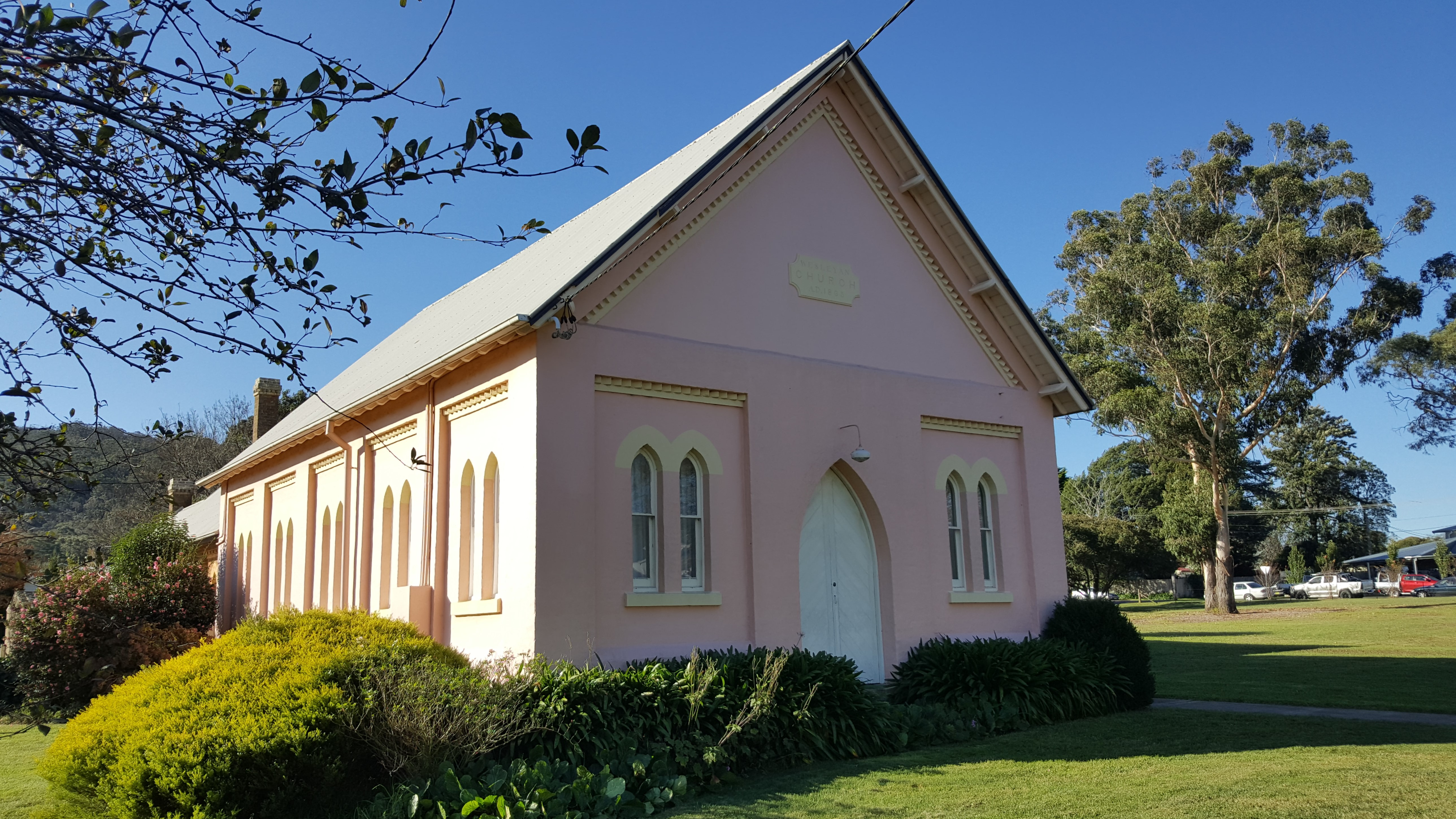
Mittagong Methodist church, now the Uniting church, in May 2021.

The simple roof trusses of the Uniting Church, in Albert Street, Mittagong—originally built as the Methodist Church—are made of iron from the Fitzroy Iron Works, and the foundation stone was laid by the then chairman of its board of directors on 24 May 1865. The only other building that made extensive use of iron from the old ironworks, Vickery's Chambers, in Pitt Street, Sydney, is gone; this large building was either remodelled or, otherwise, demolished and replaced, apparently in stages, between 1922 and 1940.

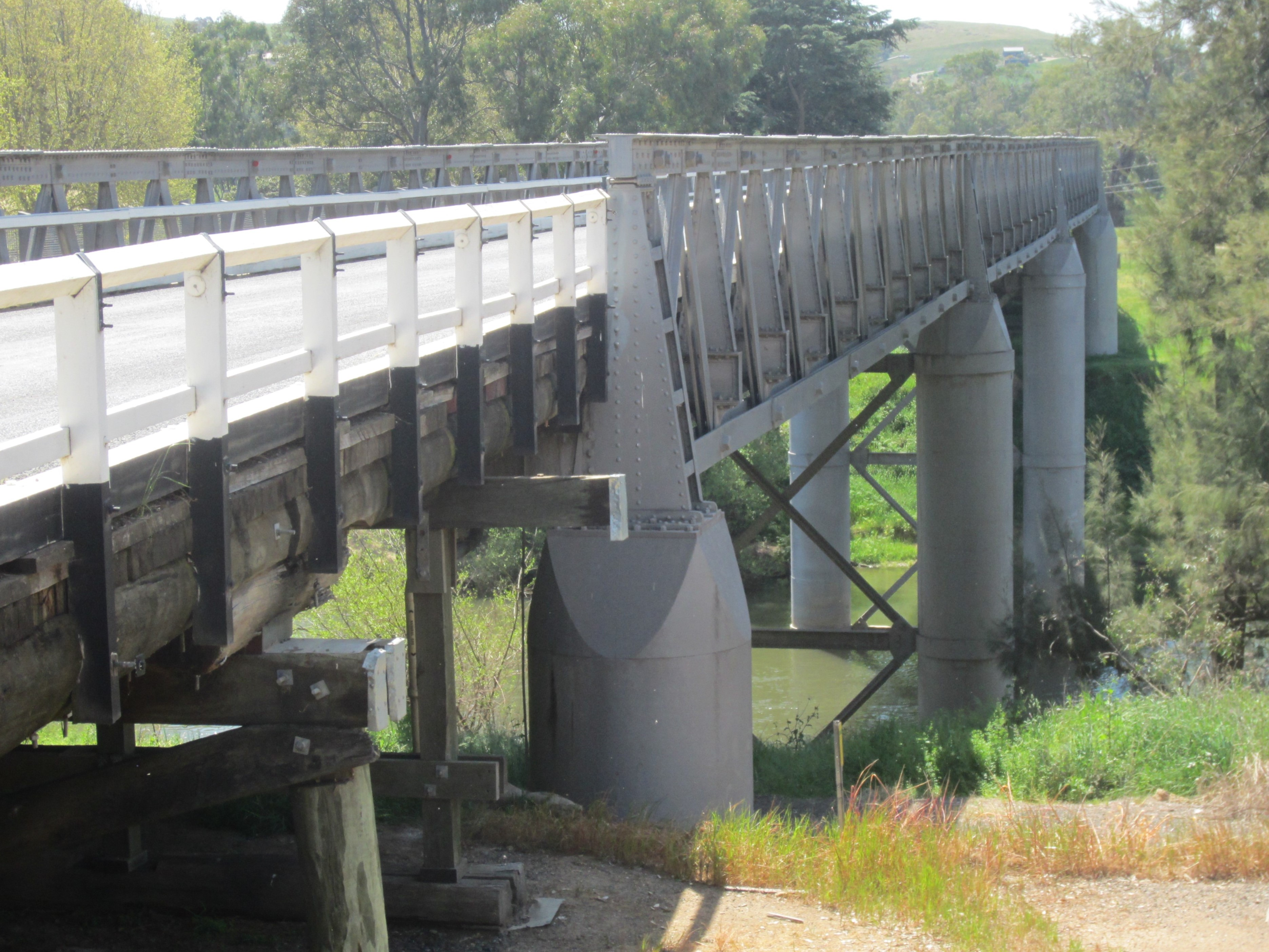
Wrought-iron spans of the Prince Alfred Bridge at Gundagai, N.S.W., viewed from the southern bank (Oct. 2019). Cast-iron cylindrical casings of the supporting columns were cast in 1865-1866 at Fitzroy Iron Works, from iron smelted there.

Cast-iron cylindrical casings used in the supporting columns of the Prince Alfred Bridge over the Murrumbidgee River at Gundagai were cast in the foundry of the Fitzroy Iron Works from iron smelted there. Although no longer a part of the Hume Highway since 1977, the bridge—opened in 1867—still stands and carries local traffic.

The cast-iron cylindrical casings for the supporting columns of the Denison Bridge across the Macquarie River at Bathurst—built 1869–1870—were cast at P. N. Russell & Co.'s foundry in Sydney, mainly using pig-iron from the Fitzroy Iron Works. —iron that "proved, by the test, far superior in tenacity to the best imported pig iron." The Denison Bridge still stands, but is used now only by pedestrians.

The Fitzroy Iron Works itself was a commercial failure, but it played a part in laying the foundations of the later success of the Australian iron and steel industry.

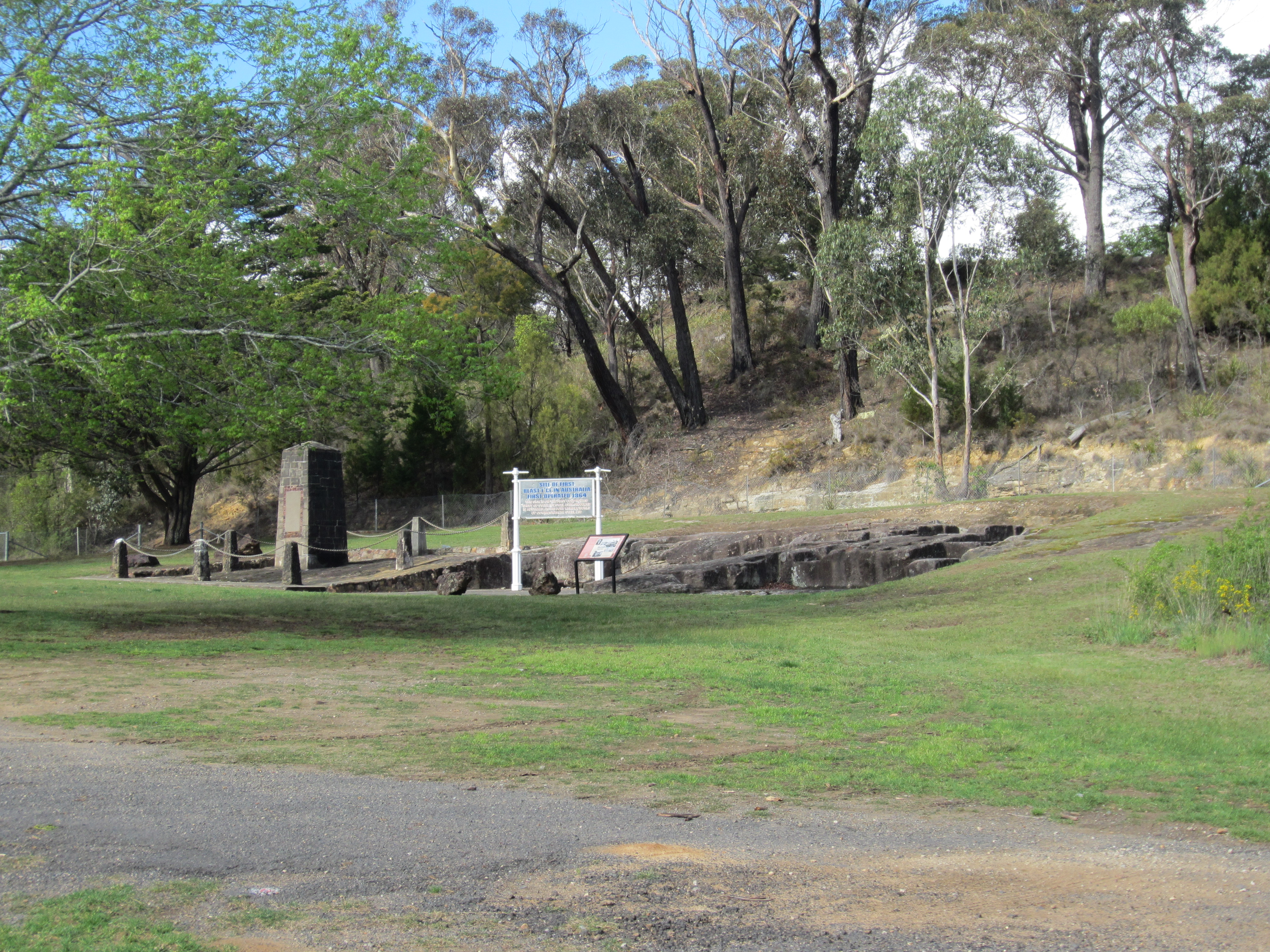
Fitzroy Iron Works, site of the former blast furnace adjacent to the modern-day Ironmines Oval, Mittagong. The commemorative cairn erected in 1948 is on the left. (Oct. 2018)

The blast furnace built at the Fitzroy Iron Works, in 1863–64, was the first blast furnace in Australia. Enoch Hughes, who supervised the construction of that blast furnace at Mittagong, was later employed with the Lithgow Valley Iron Works (later known as the Eskbank Ironworks) at Lithgow. In 1875, he built another blast furnace at Lithgow, which operated until 1882. During his second period at Mittagong, during the year 1868, the Fitzroy Iron Works rolling mills produced the first iron plate rolled in Australia, and Hughes also claimed to have rolled the first iron rails there. After Hughes, in late 1868, came Thomas Bladen, who later also worked as the government's inspector at the Eskbank Ironworks, where he clashed with Hughes who had become the works' manager there.

William Sandford leased the Fitzroy Iron Works to roll iron rails in 1886. After nine months, in 1887, he relocated his operations to the Eskbank Ironworks at Lithgow. He owned the Eskbank Ironworks, in 1901 when it first made steel and when its new blast furnace—the first truly modern one in Australia—entered service in May 1907. Sandford is viewed, justifiably, as the father of the iron and steel industry in Australia. A later owner of the works at Lithgow relocated the operation—between 1928 and 1931—to Port Kembla, where steel is still made today.

Hughes, Bladen and Sandford were only some of the people who were at the Fitzroy Works and later went to the Eskbank Ironworks. Thus there is an unbroken link from the pioneering efforts at the Fitzroy Iron Works, via the Eskbank Ironworks, to Port Kembla and the modern iron and steel industry in Australia.

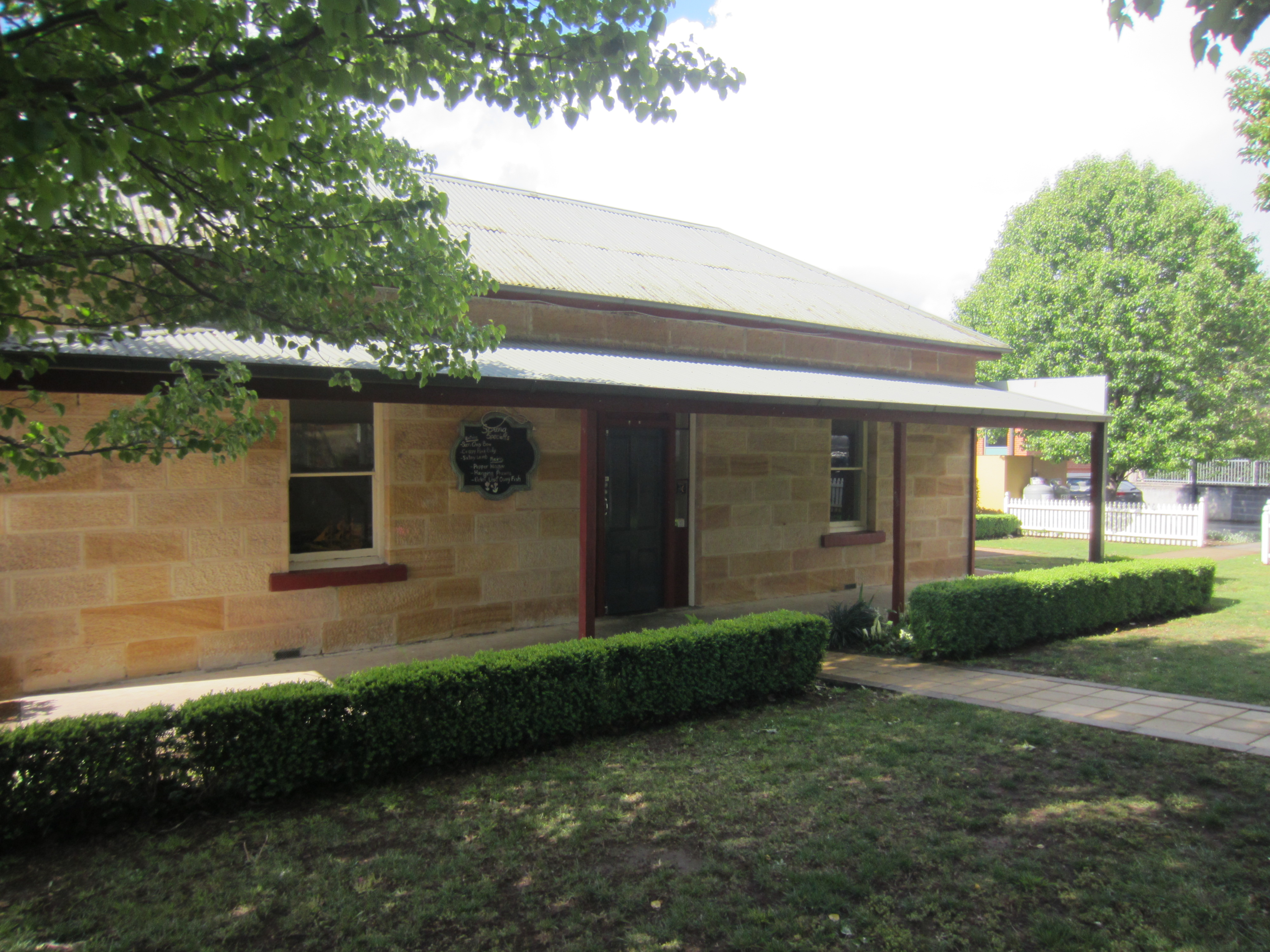
'Ironstone Cottage', the former Fitzroy Iron Works manager's residence (Oct. 2018)

In the last decade of the 19th-Century, there was a push for federation of the Australian colonies, abolishing customs duties between the colonies, and establishing tariff protection of local industry. From 1 January 1893, the N.S.W. colonial government imposed a duty of 10 shillings per ton on imported pig-iron. There had been no significant amount of pig-iron smelted from ore in N.S.W. since 1882, and this tariff was an incentive to resume local production of pig-iron. The N.S.W. iron and steel industry benefitted from the influence of N.S.W politicians advocating protection —such as George Dibbs, William Lyne and John See—over those advocating free-trade —such as George Reid—especially as the cost of locally rolled iron fell below the cost of imports for some types of wrought iron products. N.S.W entered the new Commonwealth of Australia as the only state with a large scale iron and steel industry, and it remained so for the first four decades of the 20th-Century.

The change in government policy toward industry protection came far too late to assist the Fitzroy Iron Works, which had first proven that iron of a good quality could be made from local iron ore.

The hard-won experience of Fitzroy Iron Works influenced later thinking on the siting of iron and steel works close to coking coal deposits and transport. Marulan—the same source of limestone flux used by the Fitzroy works—has been used by the Port Kembla steelworks since 1928.

The Fitzroy Iron Works is commemorated by a memorial erected in 1948 at the site of the blast furnace and the remains of the iron works uncovered in 2004 with interpretive signage.

The only complete structure that is a remnant of the iron works is "Ironstone Cottage", a sandstone cottage on the Old Hume Highway, which was once used by managers of the iron works.

=== Heritage listing ===
Some of the original iron works structure, located in the carpark of a shopping centre, has been preserved. In January 2025, the archaeological site and its moveable heritage was listed on the New South Wales State Heritage Register, as "the only known physical remains of 19th-century iron processing in Australia".

== See also ==
- The Chalybeate Spring and iron ore deposit at Mittagong
- Lithgow Blast Furnace—another 19th century blast furnace in New South Wales
- Bogolong Iron Mine and Blast Furnace—another 19th century blast furnace in New South Wales
- List of 19th century iron smelting operations in Australia
