= Simon Zöllner =

German-Australian manufacturer

Simon Zöllner (1821 – October 17, 1880) was an Australian iron and steel manufacturer, metal and alloy manufacturer and metal goods manufacturer. Zöllner was born in Posen (Poznan), Prussia and died in Potts Point, Sydney.

Zollner's main business interest was the Sydney Galvanizing Works, which by 1870 employed 52 men and boys and used 15 to 18 tons of black sheet-iron a week to manufacture galvanized iron products.

In 1862–1863, he was one of four prominent new shareholders that reformed the company operating the Fitzroy Iron Works at Mittagong.
