= Stephen Chambers =

British artist and Royal Academician

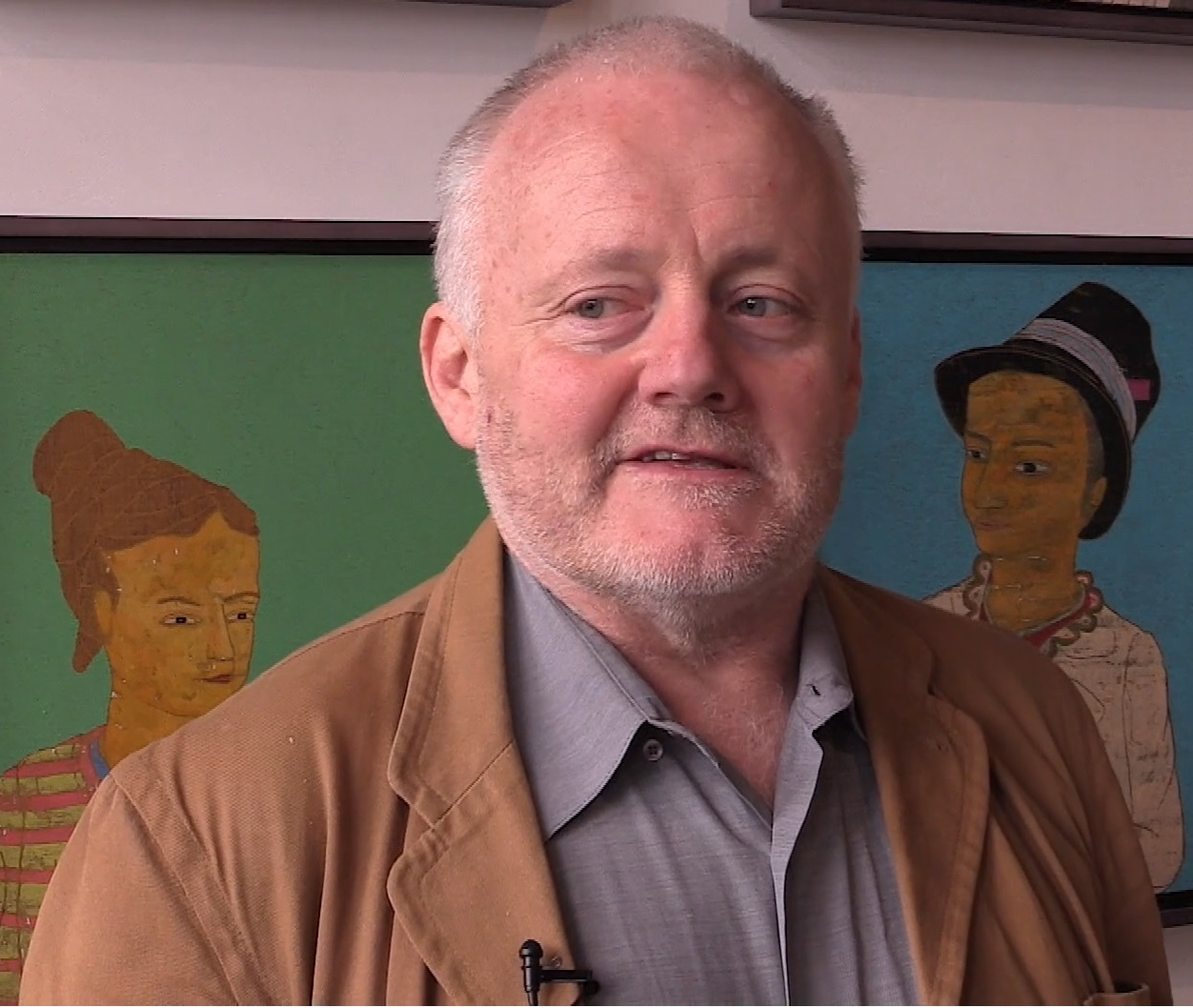
- Chambers in 2017
- Born: 20 July 1960 (age 65); Kensington, London
- Education: Holland Park School; Winchester School of Art (Fd, 1978–79); Saint Martin's School of Art (BA, 1979–82); Chelsea School of Art (MA, 1982–83)
- Elected: Royal Academy of Arts (13 December 2005)

Stephen Lyon Chambers (born 20 July 1960) is an English artist and Royal Academician (elected 2005).

== Early life and education ==
Born 20 July 1960 in Kensington, London to book illustrator Gillian Mure Wood (22 February 1932 – 28 June 2012) and building surveyor John Tangye Chambers (1929 – 5 May 2023). Stephen Chambers has three siblings Claire, Emma and Philip. He is the grandson of The Rev. Gilbert John Marion Chambers (4 December 1899 – 13 July 1945), great-grandson of John Moginie Chambers (1861 – 8 March 1918) and second great-grandson of colonial-era Industrialist John Chambers (1839 – 27 September 1903), who helped create one of the 'largest contemporary industrial enterprises in Auckland Province' by establishing the Onehunga Ironworks, once claimed to be the largest ironworks in the Southern Hemisphere. Chambers is also a descendant of Sir Richard Tangye and relative of Sir David Lean.

Stephen Chambers attended Holland Park Comprehensive and grew up in a 'cultural milieu' in the company of Sir Robin Day and painter Roger Hilton.

Chambers studied a foundation degree at Winchester School of Art from 1978 to 1979, an undergraduate degree at Saint Martin's School of Art, from 1979 to 1982. In 1983, he received a master's degree from Chelsea School of Art, where he was taught by Eileen Cooper. He was awarded the Rome Scholarship, a Fellowship at Winchester School of Art, and a Mark Rothko Memorial Trust Travelling Award.

== Career ==
From 1998 to 1999, Chambers was the Kettle’s Yard / Downing College, Cambridge Fellow. In 2016, he was awarded an Honorary Fellowship from Downing College, one of the constituent colleges of the University of Cambridge.

Chambers co-founded the Bryan Robertson Trust, a charity 'to assist artists through quiet moments in their career'. He was elected to the Royal Academy of Arts the following year on 13 December 2005.

Chambers has exhibited widely, with more than 40 solo presentations, including The Big Country at the Royal Academy of Arts, London, in 2012, and at the Pera Museum, Istanbul, in 2014.

He has collaborated with Ashley Page and Orlando Gough on three contemporary dance productions for The Royal Ballet, London: Sleeping with Audrey (1996),Room of Cooks (1997, 1999), and This House Will Burn (2001).

According to the artist, his work “speaks of states of mind, behaviours and sensibilities.” Critics have praised Chamber’s use of colour and his painterly exploration of his medium.

In May 2017, Chambers staged an exhibition entitled The Court of Redonda as an official collateral event at the Biennale Arte 2017 (Venice Biennale). The exhibition took its name from the literary legend of the Kingdom of Redonda, to which Chambers was introduced by the writings of the Spanish novelist Javier Marías. Following the Venice exhibition, Chambers was awarded the title of Viscount Biennale of Redonda, and his Redondan works featured in 2018 at the Heong Gallery at Downing College, Cambridge.

== Collections ==
His work is held in international collections, including: Arts Council England; Deutsche Bank, London; Downing College, Cambridge;Government Art Collection, London; Metropolitan Museum, New York; Pera Museum, Istanbul, and the Victoria and Albert Museum, London.

== Personal life ==
Chambers lives and works between London and Berlin.
