= Enoch Hughes =

Iron-master

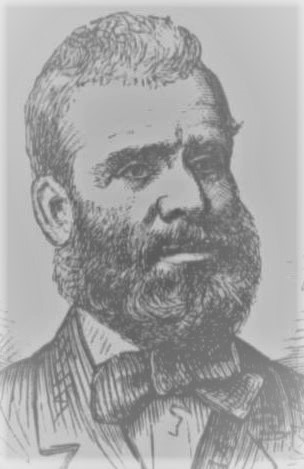
Enoch Hughes c.1879

Enoch Hughes (1829 – 10 April 1893) was an English-born iron-master and pioneer of the iron industry in both Australia and New Zealand. Migrating to Australia, at a time when there was little technical knowledge of the iron industry in the colonies, Hughes became an influential figure, largely because he was self-confident in his own abilities, a tireless worker, and an avid self-promoter. While he was associated with many iron industry ventures—both successful and unsuccessful ones—he is remembered particularly for his time at the Eskbank Ironworks. He was also a significant figure in the brick-making industry of New South Wales.

During his career, he constructed three colonial-era iron-smelting blast furnaces; at Mittagong (1863–64)—the first in Australia—at Lithgow (1875), and at Onehunga, New Zealand (1890). He also erected several iron rolling mills—including the first one in Australia to enter commercial production, in 1860—in both Australia and New Zealand. He was less successful as a works manager and businessman, with most of his efforts ending in financial losses and in great acrimony. He was charged but not convicted of bigamy, twice made bankrupt, and served a prison sentence for perjury.

Later in the 19th century, when the industry required more scientific and engineering knowledge, 'practical men' like Hughes became less appreciated and less influential.

== Early life in England ==
Enoch Hughes was born at Dudley—then in Worcestershire but now in West Midlands—England, in 1829. He was apprenticed to an ironworks at fourteen, spending the next fourteen years working in the English iron industry. Hughes stated that he had worked at the Bloomfield Ironworks of BBH, at Tipton, and Chillington, Lea Brooke, Bilston Forge, and Spring Vale Ironworks, near Wolverhampton.

He migrated to Australia in 1857, arriving in Melbourne in January 1858.

== Australia ==
=== Melbourne ===
By 1858, no iron was being made in Australia but there was an accumulation of scrap iron. Hughes saw the opportunity to rework scrap iron into bars. In partnership with Benjamin Marks, he set up the Victoria Rolling Mill and Iron Fencing Company, in Dudley St, West Melbourne, which opened in June 1860. Although this was the second mill erected—the first was at the Fitzroy Iron Works in 1857—the Victoria Rolling Mill was the first iron rolling mill in Australia to enter commercial production. The partnership with Marks ended soon afterwards, in August 1860, probably leaving Hughes with inadequate financial backing for the venture. From 1860 to mid-1862, Hughes was winning tenders for ironwork, including wrought-iron fencing for the Melbourne Botanic Gardens and a grate for Pentridge Prison. The works were sold and—without Hughes—continued in successful operation until the early 1920s. Victorian Rolling Mills moved to another site, at Brooklyn. It continued as a company under that name, until it merged with another company, Lion Rolling Mills, to form Melbourne Iron and Steel Mills, in 1929. Melbourne Iron and Steel Mills continued to operate, at least until 1959.

Hughes became involved in partnership to erect a plant to roll sheet iron in Melbourne. Land, on the south bank of the Yarra River, was granted for this purpose. Hughes fell into dispute with his partner, which led to legal proceedings that ended in June 1862. The sheet iron works was never built.

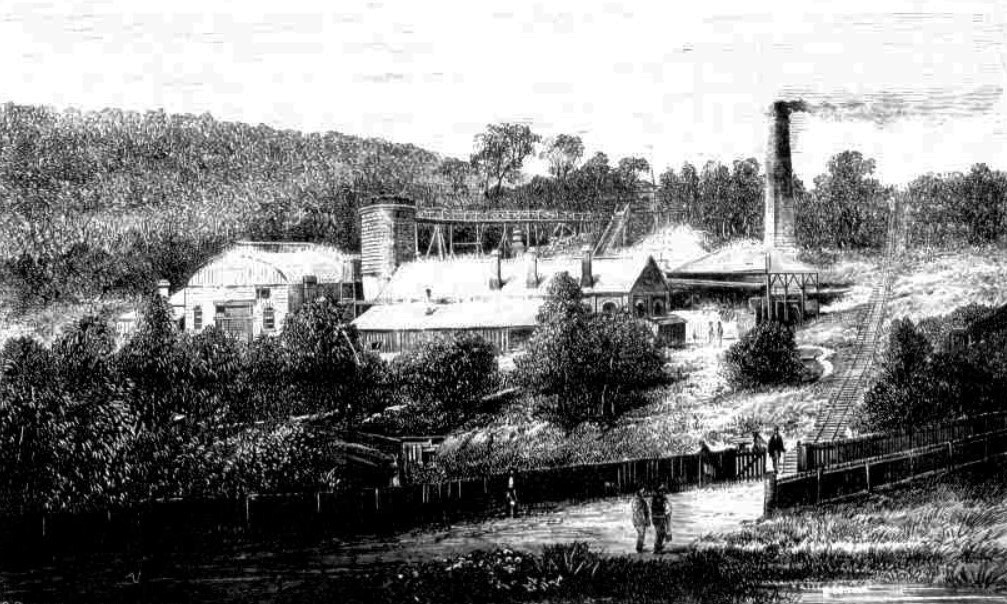
Blast furnace area, also known as 'the Top Works', of the Fitzroy Iron Works c.1873, after Hughes' blast furnace had been converted to hot-blast. It was in building this part of the works that Benjamin Lattin lost his fortune.

=== Fitzroy Iron Works ===
By October 1862, Enoch Hughes was already the works manager of the Fitzroy Iron Works, at Mittagong, N.S.W. before those works were leased to Benjamin Wright Lattin, a wholesale grocer from Melbourne. Lattin agreed to construct a blast furnace—capable of producing 120 to 150 tons of iron per week—at his own cost, in exchange for shares in the company. Lattin chose Hughes to supervise the construction of the furnace. It seems likely, however, that Hughes had been working to interest Lattin in providing the financial backing for the venture—since late 1862 at least—with the prospect of a contract for 10,000 tons of iron rails as the key incentive. During construction of the blast furnace, to provide cash flow, scrap iron was purchased and rerolled into bars.

Hughes had left England at a time when blast furnace technology was changing rapidly, and he had not kept his knowledge current. The blast furnace that he constructed for Lattin was an old fashioned design—cold blast with an open top—similar to a Scottish design of the 1830s. Hughes used fire-bricks that were made from fire-clay found on the site of the works.

Building the furnace had financially ruined Lattin. When the furnace was first lit in July 1864—Hughes had left by March—it proved to be a failure. It made only about 80 tons of iron, before it was reconfigured as a hot-blast furnace by the next manager, Joseph Kaye Hampshire. It was, nonetheless, the first blast furnace in Australia, and, after modification, it operated successfully, from May 1865 to January 1866, and again—with further modifications— from February 1876 to March 1877. Hughes went back to the works in May 1865, just after hot-blast operation commenced—probably to learn something about the operation—but was ejected forcefully. Hughes attempted to disassociate himself from the failures of his time there, later denying—at least once—that he was ever the manager of the Fitzroy works.

=== Sydney ===
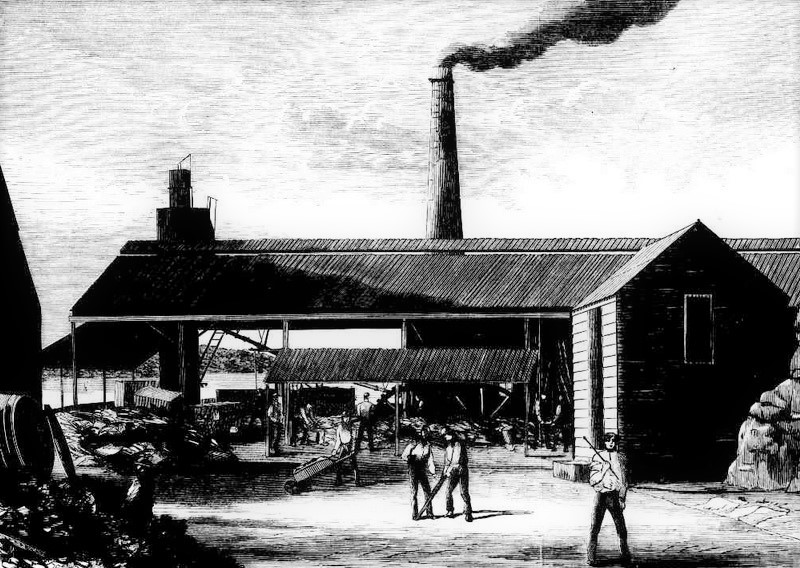
City Iron Works at Pyrmont, c.1870, after Enoch Hughes had left the business.

Hughes moved to Sydney, where he set up the City Iron Works at Pyrmont for its owner, Alexander Brown, and worked again with Lattin who was the manager. He left this enterprise, he later stated, because he was not offered a share in the company's ownership. This venture initially reworked scrap iron, rolling into it into metal bars, but later for a time also puddling imported pig-iron; it operated successfully for many years at Pyrmont, relocating to Alexandria in 1938 and still in business in the 1950s.

In November 1864, a charge of bigamy against Hughes—apparently based upon the evidence of his own brother—was dropped; it seems that his first wife had indeed died before he remarried.

By March 1865, he had erected the Balmain Fire Brick and Clay Works and was trading as 'Messrs. Hughes and Son'. In July 1865, in a departure from his normal lines of business, he won a tender to demolish and remove the materials of the old George Street post office in Sydney, to make way for the construction of a new post office.

=== Bankruptcy, prison, and a vision for an iron industry ===
Hughes was made bankrupt for the first time, in August 1865. A statement that he made under oath during his bankruptcy hearing, about his father's control of the brick-making venture, led to Hughes's committal and trial on a charge of perjury in December 1865. He was convicted and sentenced to two-years imprisonment with hard labour, which he served at Port Macquarie Gaol. His sentence was remitted and, upon release, he returned to the Fitzroy Iron Works.

While Hughes had been imprisoned, his father (Moses Hughes) and a partner (Drury) had opened a brickworks, on the Burwood Estate near Newcastle, a highly successful enterprise that lasted into the 1980s. In October 1867, under the pseudonym "E.H.", he wrote the first of a series of letters to newspapers extolling Newcastle, N.S.W., as a location for an iron works, complete with estimates of production costs. Newcastle would indeed later become the site of a successful steelworks, in 1915. A later letter written by Hughes on the same theme, in 1872, influenced the formation of the Tasmanian Charcoal Iron Company to mine and smelt iron ore in Northern Tasmania.

=== Return to Mittagong ===
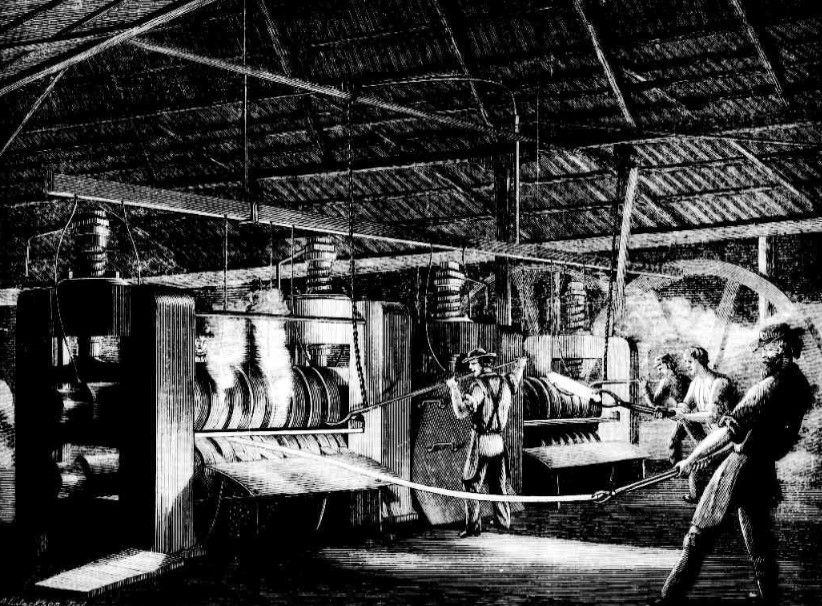
Rolling Mill of the Fitzroy Iron Works c.1868, around the time that Enoch Hughes and his brother leased the works..

Enoch Hughes and his brother leased the puddling furnaces and rolling mill of the Fitzroy Iron Works between February and June 1868. They puddled left over pig-iron, then shingled and rolled it. While there, Hughes rolled the first plate rolled in Australia, and claimed to have rolled the first rails. The venture was not profitable. It was soon after this that Enoch Hughes is first recorded as being interested in solving the problem of smelting New Zealand iron-sand.

=== Brickmaking ===
In early 1869, Hughes returned to brickmaking, becoming manager of Goodsell and Tye's brickworks at Newtown in Sydney and he was for a short time a partner in this venture In late 1869, Hughes was released from bankruptcy, and by late 1871 was operating the Enmore Pressed Brick Company. He also was an agent for his father's brickworks.

=== Lithgow ===
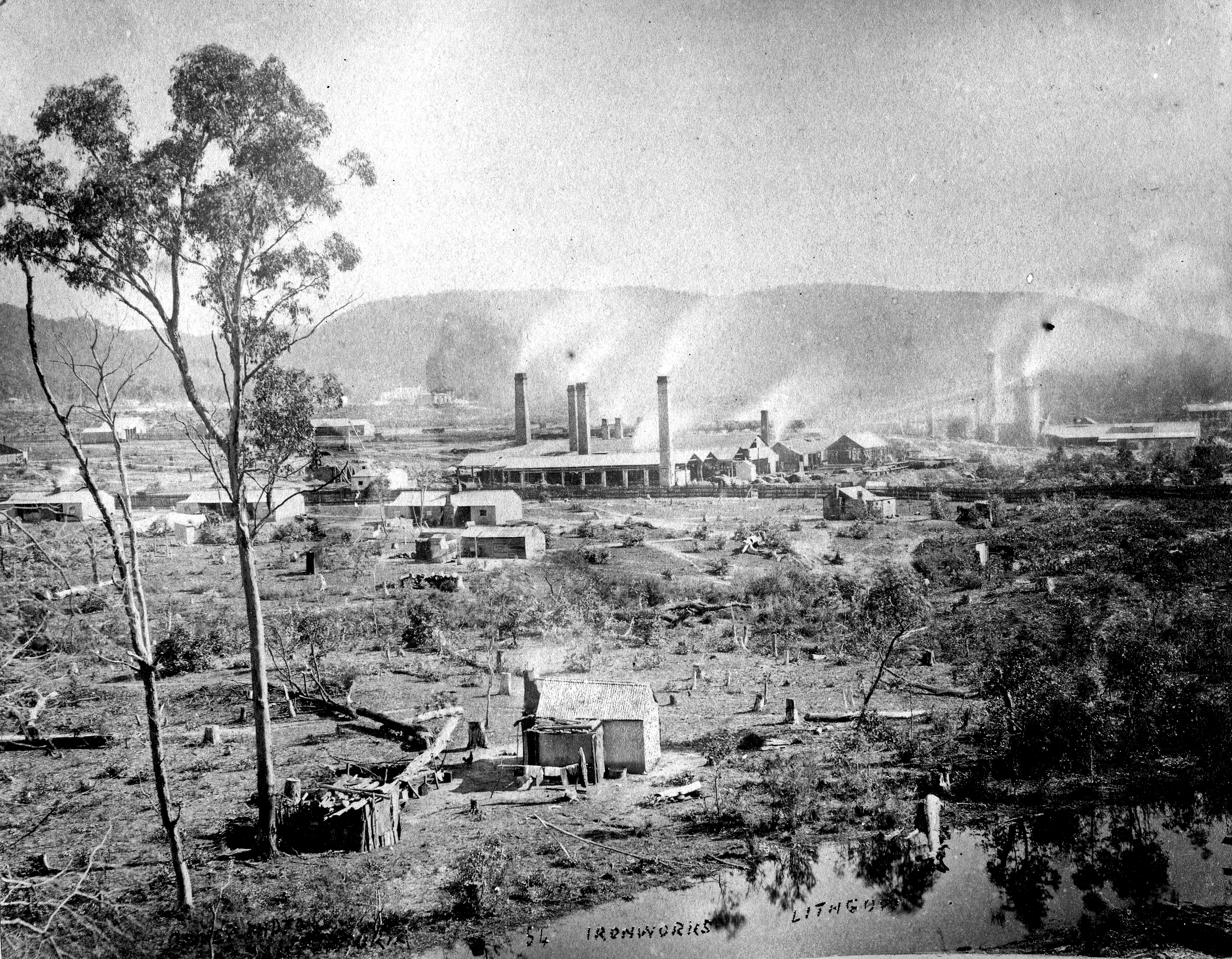
Ironworks at Lithgow c. 1880, around the time that Enoch Hughes was manager. The blast furnace built by Hughes is on the right and appears to be operating, meaning the date is 1882 or earlier.

Hughes retained his ambition to set up an iron industry, shifting his attention to the iron ore, coal and limestone deposits near Wallerawang. The venture was to be known as the Great Western Iron Works, and the company the Great Western Iron & Coal Company. But apparently he fell out with his partners in this potential iron-making venture, and they held the lease over the ore-bearing land at Piper's Flat. The site near Wallerawang was, in the eyes of experts at the time, a uniquely promising location for an iron and steelworks, but, despite some later attempts, nothing was ever built there.

In July 1874, Hughes and others took out a lease on some land at Lithgow. By November 1874, he was already at work preparing to make the bricks needed for furnaces of an ironworks at Lithgow. This time, the venture was able to obtain some important and influential shareholders, particularly James Rutherford, John Sutherland (N.S.W Minister for Public Works), Daniel Williams, and Thomas Denny (owner of the Denison Foundry in Bathurst), resulting in the establishment of the Lithgow Valley Iron Company (later the Eskbank Ironworks) at Lithgow.

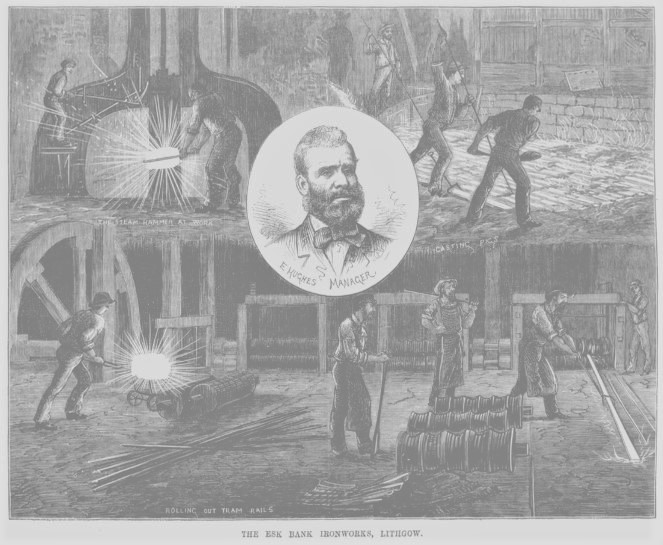
Views of the Eskbank Ironworks c1879, with Hughes' portrait in the centre.

Hughes' blast furnace at Lithgow was quite similar in concept to the design that he had used at Fitzroy Iron Works, with an 'open-top' and initially cold-blast, but of a stronger cylindrical design bound in iron. Hughes had once again built a blast furnace of an antiquated design; it was not converted to hot blast until 1877. Hughes was later to boast that he had designed and erected this furnace himself and "never paid an engineer or a draftsman a shilling in my life". Despite these deficiencies, the furnace made iron—just 400 tons from 28 November 1875 until its first shutdown in February 1876—well enough that the company later added puddling furnaces and rolling mills, to enable it to make bar iron and rails. The end of the rival blast furnace operations at Mittagong, in March 1877, boosted the prospects of the newer Lithgow works.

By 1879, as well as its blast furnace, the works had eight puddling furnaces, rolling mills and mill furnaces. It was sourcing its iron ore from the small deposits in the hills around Lithgow, and from Newbridge and Blaney. With a scarcity of suitably skilled labour in the colony, Hughes recruited workers from the ranks of immigrant ironworkers arriving from Great Britain.

The company won contracts to make iron rails, and to reroll old iron rails into new ones. However, as works manager, Hughes embarrassed the company, when he clashed with the government's inspector Thomas Bladen over product quality, and was caught out clumsily covering up defects in tramway rails by Bladen. Worse followed, when the major shareholders found that the overdraft of the works, from the Commercial Banking Company of Sydney, had blown out to £75,000.

In 1881–1882, Hughes was in a state of dispute, with the other partners who were manoeuvring to buy him out and be rid of him. Hughes' blast furnace at the Eskbank Ironworks finally closed in 1882, and it is reported that James Rutherford—to avoid the temptation to ever reopen it—used two dray-loads of blasting powder to blow it up, in the dead of night.

Hughes had left Lithgow, by September 1883, and was made bankrupt, for the second time, in May 1884.

=== Working for William Sandford ===
For four months in 1886, Enoch Hughes worked as a manager for William Sandford, who took a lease on the Fitzroy Iron Works at Mittagong, in March 1886, in order to re-roll scrapped iron rails under a contract to the NSW Government that he shared with the Eskbank Iron Works at Lithgow. Production commenced in August 1886, ending after nine months, when Sandford took the work to the Eskbank Ironworks.

Hughes had engaged in a public debate—via letters to newspapers in August–September 1885—with W. M. Foote, lecturer on iron and steel to the Board of Technical Education. In a speech that he had made, Foote had advanced the proposition that it was not the lack of tariff protection that had resulted in the failures of the iron-making operations at Mittagong and Lithgow, but rather, "ignorance, bungling stupidity, and mismanagement". That could only be understood as an implicit and very harsh criticism of Hughes, and Hughes in turn retorted that, "we imported some theorists of the Technical College lecturing type and such a class of theorists have ruined our iron-manufacturing efforts from that time to this."

In December 1886, Sandford—a strong advocate of protection—defended Hughes against the criticism of his earlier career and abilities (by Foote), saying, "Do not let us despise the day of small things, or sneer at such men as Enoch Hughes and others, for their efforts. Is it not better to be men who have tried against great odds, and apparently failed than those who have never made an effort".

Although Foote had been very rude to Hughes, in the way that he had stated his argument, the demonstrably poor outcomes tended to support the thrust of his accusations. The days of the so-called 'practical men' in managing the local iron industry were coming to an end, and managers with formal technical training would be a part of its future.

As a footnote to this controversy, by 1892, Foote had changed his tune somewhat and was advocating protection of locally-rolled iron, but he remained implacably opposed to a bonus payment as an inducement to commence local production.

== New Zealand ==
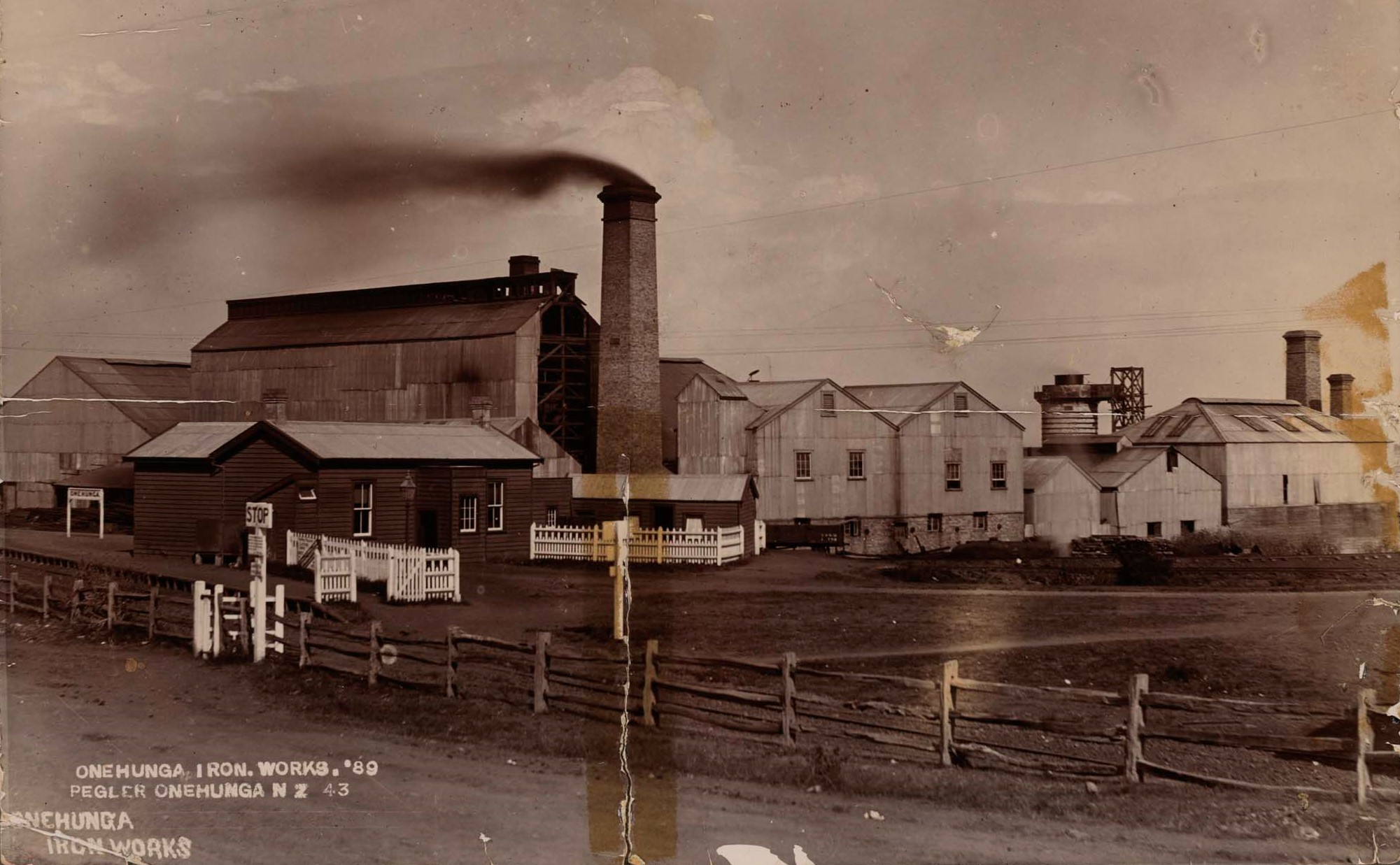
Onehunga Ironworks c.1889, around the time that Hughes was manager. The blast furnace is the circular structure, with its materials elevator, in the right background. (Pegler, Enos Silvenus, photographer, Ellen Louise McLeod collection. Auckland Museum. Cropped from the original image.)

Perhaps more wary of operating a business while being bankrupt—for a second time—in New South Wales and with his reputation as an iron-master having been questioned, Hughes went to New Zealand. In July 1887 Hughes was reported to be in treaty to buy the Onehunga Ironworks

The Onehunga Ironworks had been founded in 1883, to smelt New Zealand's plentiful iron-sand, by an ingenious direct reduction method. The venture had failed to prosper after the works' American manager, who had the smelting expertise, was sent to prison for attempted murder. Operations continued initially, but had ceased completely in March 1887.

Hughes took over as manager of the Onehunga works in August 1887, contracted to erect and operate the rolling mills to re-roll iron made from scrap. He brought some experienced iron-workers from Lithgow and, like the Eskbank works at Lithgow, operated Onehunga as a 'co-operative'. The operation was successful but soon had rolled more bars than it could sell. Under his management the works was expanded in 1889 to make galvanised corrugated iron.

Hughes was first recorded as being interested in solving the problem of smelting New Zealand iron-sand, as early as September 1868. His original plan was to mix the ironsand with hematite ore (from Kamo near Whangārei) and smelt this mixture. By later in 1887, this had changed to making iron bars, using iron made from scrap iron with a 20% iron-sands admixture.

Hughes expressed complete confidence that he could smelt the iron-sands profitably, but it seems that he only ever did so experimentally and on a small scale. In June 1889, he said that the works had made iron entirely from iron-sand. Hughes position on the technology of iron-sand smelting seems to have been that direct reduction would not work—at least on a commercial scale—and only a blast furnace could be successful. This is the opposite to the modern practice in iron-sand smelting. Hughes was backing the wrong approach, and was out of his depth in understanding the daunting technical issues involved. He should have been aware of the failure of an earlier attempt to smelt iron sands, in a blast furnace near New Plymouth, but seems to have drawn the wrong conclusions from its partial success in making some pig-iron.

In July 1889, a blast furnace was under construction at Onehunga. The furnace made its first pig-iron, in July 1890. It seems that the iron was made with conventional iron ore, not iron-sand. Hughes never achieved his goal of smelting iron-sand commercially. In early September 1890, the furnace was 'allowed to cool', reportedly as a result of insufficient coal, due to industrial trouble at the mines, and was never used again.

In late October 1890, Hughes was advocating the erection of a blast furnace at Kamo near Whangārei, where there was an iron ore deposit, with coal and limestone nearby. He was openly stating that Onehunga could not compete with a works at Kamo. His grand plans for Kamo came to nothing, other than to further alienate his employers at Onehunga.

By December 1890, he had been sacked by Onehunga and was suing the company and a little later was trying to dispose of his shares in it.

== Final years in Australia ==
Hughes returned to Australia and, in August 1891, made an application to be released from bankruptcy. A certificate releasing him from bankruptcy was issued in October 1891, but only after three cottages located at The Junction, in Newcastle—apparently newly-identified assets—had been sold off.

In September 1892, Hughes was made general manager of The Australian Gas Retort and Firebrick Manufacturing Company, of South Yarra, in Melbourne.

Enoch Hughes died on 10 April 1893 at his house in South Yarra, and was said to be 62-years old (if so, he was born in 1831, not 1829). He was survived by his second wife, Roderickina (née McDonald), four sons, and two daughters.

== Legacy ==
In May 1907, around the time of the opening of Australia's first modern blast furnace at the Eskbank Ironworks, Hughes was extolled as a visionary pioneer of the industry, probably due to the influence of the then owner of the Eskbank Ironworks, his old colleague and loyal defender, William Sandford. Although other erstwhile business associates held less favourable views of his character and abilities, Hughes was, nonetheless, a pioneer of the industry, for better or worse.

Two of the early rolling mill ventures, which he founded in Australia, survived into the mid 20th Century. However, the iron works at Onehunga closed by August 1895, and a commercially-viable process to smelt ironsand—now the basis of the modern steel industry of New Zealand—was not developed until the 1950s.

Although he was there only at its very beginnings, the enterprise that Hughes founded at Lithgow, in 1874, did carry on, under various ownership and operating arrangements, until it was relocated to the coast at Port Kembla, between 1928 and 1932, as Australian Iron & Steel. It later became a subsidiary of BHP, and is now a part of Bluescope Steel. Port Kembla is still the largest producer of steel in Australia.

== See also ==
- Fitzroy Iron Works
- Lithgow Blast Furnace
- Onehunga Ironworks
