= Onehunga Ironworks =

Former ironworks in New Zealand

Coordinates: 36°55′31″S 174°47′15″E

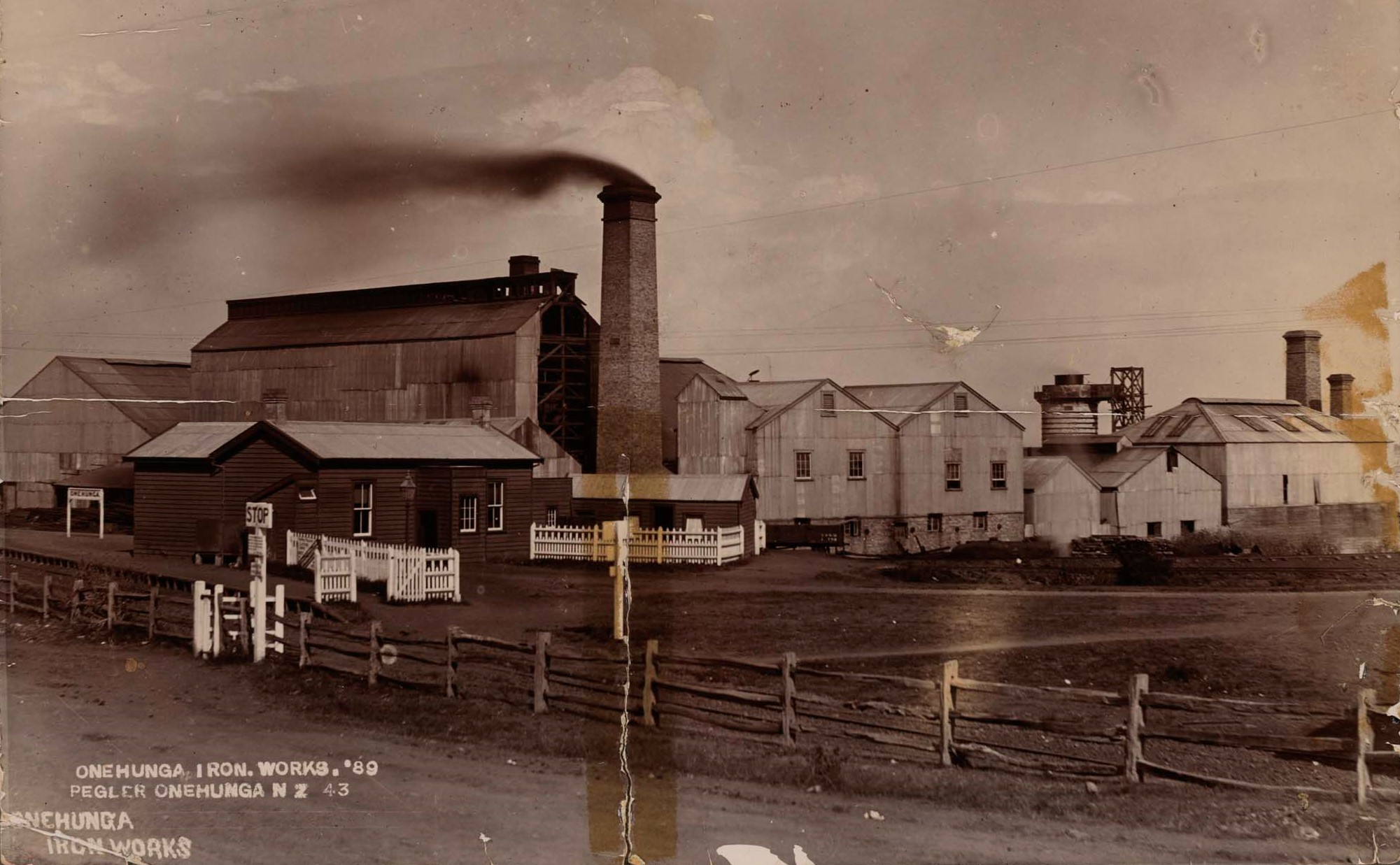
Onehunga Ironworks c.1889, Pegler, Enos Silvenus, d. 1938, photographer. The original Onehunga Railway Station is in the left foreground. The blast furnace is the circular structure with its materials elevator, in the right background. The large chimney in the middle of the photograph survived until at least 1968. (This photograph is from the Ellen Louise McLeod collection of photographs of the Auckland Museum. The image shown has been cropped from the original image in the museum's collection.)

The Onehunga Ironworks was a colonial-era iron smelting and rolling operation at Onehunga, on the Manukau Harbour, (now a suburb of Auckland, New Zealand). It was at one time claimed to be the largest ironworks in the Southern Hemisphere. It is significant, both as the first large scale attempt to exploit New Zealand's iron-sand by direct reduction, and as a precursor of the modern steel industry of New Zealand.

The ironworks was located adjacent to the original Onehunga railway station. It operated—but not continuously—from 1883 to around 1895. It was partially demolished around 1903 but its brick chimney and some of its other structures were still standing in the late 1960s.

== Historical context ==
=== New Zealand's iron-sand resource ===
Vast deposits of iron-sand exist over 480 kilometres of the North Island's coast from Kaipara Harbour down to Whanganui. These iron-sand deposits are rich in the mineral titanomagnetite that originates as crystals within volcanic rock. As the rock is eroded, rivers carry the heavy grains of titanomagnetite to the coast. Currents, wind, and wave action then move the minerals along the coastline, concentrating them in dark-coloured sands on the sea floor, on beaches and in dunes.

Captain James Cook was probably the first European to record the 'black sands' of New Zealand's North Island, during his first voyage around New Zealand in 1769–70. In 1839, Ernst Dieffenbach, employed by the New Zealand Company to describe New Zealand's natural resources, noted the 'black titanic iron-sand' on beaches along the Taranaki coast.

=== Earlier smelting of iron-sand ===
Smelting of iron-sand has been carried out successfully in Japan for centuries, The Japanese method is a type of direct-reduction smelting. Smelting occurred in a Tatara furnace. That process is slow and makes only small batches of metal (known as Tamahagane) that is used in the making of high-quality steel weapons.

Although New Zealand's iron-sands are smelted today on a commercial scale, it took many years and many failed attempts before a successful process was developed that could smelt titanomagnetite iron-sand in commercially viable volumes. Before the establishment of the Onehunga Ironworks, other attempts had been made to smelt New Zealand iron-sands, but only "partial success was attained by smelting, in furnaces, bricks formed of the ore with calcareous clay and carbonaceous matter". The most notable of these earlier ventures was the New Zealand Titanic Steel and Iron Company, which was led by Edward Smith and had erected a blast furnace at Te Henui near New Plymouth.

Attempts to smelt iron-sands in blast furnaces—the conventional means used for other iron ores—failed for two main reasons; the fine sand grains blocked the flow of hot air through the furnace—something that could be overcome, to an extent, by binding the sand into 'bricks' as mentioned above—and carbon from the coke combined with titanium in the iron-sand to produce a thick pasty layer of compounds that blocked up the tap holes used to draw off the molten iron and slag.

== History ==
=== First period of operation 1883–1887 ===
==== John Chambers ====
It was the potential to exploit deposits of iron-sand near the heads of Manukau Harbour, which led to the establishment of the Onehunga Ironworks.

John Chambers had visited England and America in 1876 trying to interest ironmakers in the iron-sand, without success, but while in America he became aware of a process by which it was claimed wrought iron could be made from iron-sand. Chambers and an American, Guy H. Gardner of New York, jointly purchased the New Zealand patent rights of the furnace design patented in 1873, by Joel Wilson of Dover, New Jersey.

Wilson provided the services of William Henry Jones to come out to New Zealand to supervise the work. A full scale furnace using this design was erected at Onehunga during 1882. This first furnace was completed by early February 1883. A public demonstration of the furnace operation and smelting of iron-sand took place in early February 1883. The first billets of wrought iron smelted from iron-sand were made on 27 February 1883.

==== New Zealand Iron and Steel Company (Limited) ====
The initial success led to the formation of a company, New Zealand Iron and Steel Company (Limited), to expand the operation. The company had a capital of £200,000 made up of 40,000 shares of £5 each. Of these shares only 9,103 were sold to the public, resulting in a paid-up capital of £45,515.

The site on which the experimental furnace had been erected, 5 acres on the south-eastern side of Onehunga railway station, was purchased. This land had a water frontage onto the harbour—allowing raw material to be landed at the works—and a rail connection. Copious supplies of freshwater could be obtained from the Onehunga Springs. A lease—from where the iron-sand would be obtained—was taken over 6.5 miles of beach (some at South Head and some at the North Head of Manukau Harbour) and 1000 acres of land at the North Head.

It was planned to erect ten new furnaces and a rolling mill was ordered.

==== Wilson's process for iron-sand smelting ====
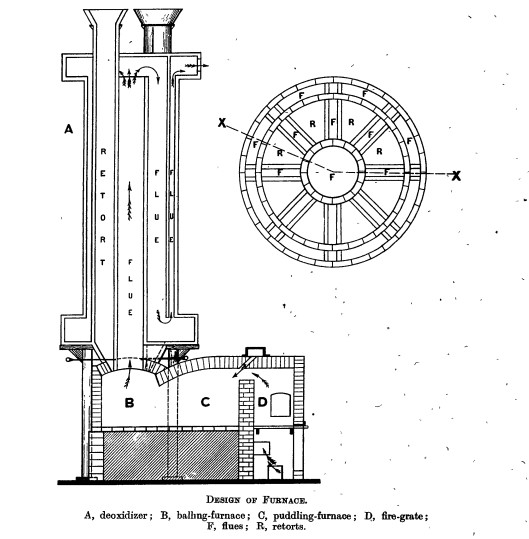
Design of Wilson's furnace.

The smelting process was based on the method of direct reduction; iron-sand mixed with fine coal was heated to red-heat inside retorts and thereby reduced to 'sponge iron', which was then ‘puddled’ and worked to produce wrought iron. Joel Wilson's furnace design was ingenious, with the three different processes—'deoxidising' (direct reduction), 'balling' and 'puddling'—taking place within different parts of the same furnace structure and fired by the same fire grate.

The iron-sand was first washed and then concentrated magnetically, to remove silica sand.

A mixture of the concentrated iron-sand and the reducing agent (fine coal) was loaded into one of the multiple retorts of the smelting furnace, where this mixture resided for about 24-hours, during which it was heated by flue gases from the puddling furnace. —The multiple retorts in each furnace allowed an essentially 'batch' process to be operated more or less continuously, another ingenious feature of Wilson's design.—When a gate-valve in the base of any retort was opened, a sticky mass of hot, reduced iron-sand was transferred (by gravity) into the 'balling' section of the furnace; here it was heated for about half an hour—again by puddling furnace flue gases—until a ball of 'sponge iron', about 18-inches in diameter, was created. This ball was then rolled across into the 'puddling' section of the furnace. The conventional 19th-century iron-making process of puddling then took place, resulting in a ball-shaped piece of puddled iron. The puddled-iron ball was then removed from the furnace, and its processing thereafter was by conventional 19th-century iron-making techniques—shingling to create wrought iron, and hot-rolling to manufacture wrought-iron bars.

==== Difficulties and first closure ====
The works' reliance on the skill and knowledge of its American manager, William Henry Jones, became a serious problem, when in December 1883, he was charged with attempted murder. Jones was convicted and sentenced to 14 years gaol in April 1884.

After Jones' imprisonment, the company employed three other ironmasters—two subsequently leaving due to ill health—but none of them could replicate the extent of successful operation that Jones had achieved. Incomplete reduction of the iron-sand caused the resulting iron to have included, within its structure, grains of partially-reduced iron-sand, which made the iron hard or brittle.

Two of the ten planned new furnaces were in service by May 1885. These new furnaces were gas-fired, with the gas being produced by Wilson gas-producers that proved to be a problem. Gas quality was initially good but, by the time the furnace was up to temperature, either the heat fell away or explosions occurred, bringing work to a stop. These difficulties were never overcome.

Chambers was to claim later that the cost of production was too high at £9 per ton.

The plant managed to continue to operate but, by November 1886, the company had liabilities of £20,000 and all its paid-up capital had been expended. The shareholders were unwilling to contribute more capital. The assets were taken over by the mortgagee, and, by March 1887, the works had shut down.

=== Second period of operation 1887–1890 ===
==== Onehunga Ironworks Company ====
The proprietors of the works were now Thomas and Samuel Morrin, who had large landholdings in the Waikato region. The venture was now known as the Onehunga Ironworks Company.

When the works shut down, rolling machinery had been bought by the New Zealand Iron and Steel Company, but had not been erected and put to work. It seems that there was also a quantity of wrought iron that had yet to be rolled into bars.

==== Enoch Hughes, expansion and the blast furnace ====
With the original manager, William Henry Jones—and his knowledge of iron-sand smelting—still in gaol, Enoch Hughes took over as manager of the Onehunga Ironworks on 22 August 1887, bringing with him some experienced workers from Australia.

Hughes came to New Zealand with many years experience in the iron industry—in England and Australia—but he had a chequered career while in Australia. Hughes recently had left the Eskbank Ironworks at Lithgow, under acrimonious circumstances and he had been blamed for the shortcomings of the blast furnace at the Fitzroy Iron Works at Mittagong, which he had erected while the works manager there in 1863–1864. However, Hughes did have a proven record in erecting and setting up iron rolling mills—he had erected the first iron rolling mill in Australia which commenced operation in June 1860—and it was in that role that he was first engaged at Onehunga.

Hughes was initially under contract to the proprietors, to erect the bar rolling mill and produce 120 tons of iron bars within four months. By late March 1888, the re-opened Onehunga Ironworks had made at least 400 tons of bars, using scrap iron and wrought iron that was already on hand at the works. Hughes operated the Onehunga works as a 'cooperative' with his workers, something he had done previously during his time at Lithgow.

By November 1888, the works had made 2000 tons of iron bar, but was finding the local demand for its bars inadequate. The proprietors then ordered a sheet mill and other equipment to make corrugated iron—the first such plant in New Zealand. At the end of June 1889, skilled workers from Pennsylvania were coming, to operate the sheet mill and commence production of corrugated iron.

Hughes had great confidence in his own abilities, including overcoming the daunting problems of smelting iron-sands. His interest in this went back to at least 1868.

The original plan was to mix the iron-sand with hematite ore (from Kamo near Whangārei) and smelt this mixture. By later in 1887, this had changed to making iron bars, using iron made from scrap iron with a 20% iron-sands admixture. Hughes expressed complete confidence that he could smelt the ironsands profitably, but it seems that he only ever did so experimentally and on a small scale. In June 1889, he said that the works had made iron entirely from iron-sand and in March 1890, such iron won first-class awards at the Dunedin Exhibition. Hughes position on the technology of iron-sand smelting seems to have been that direct reduction would not work at a commercially viable scale, and only a blast furnace —making pig-iron— could be successful. Hughes saw the solution as being to mix the iron-sand with other material such as hematite or clay-band ore.

In July 1889, a blast furnace, with a nominal capacity of 120 tons of iron per week, was under construction at Onehunga. The blast furnace was 45 feet tall, 16 feet external diameter and 11 feet at its largest internal diameter. The furnace was a hot-blast design. There was a steam winch to lift material to the top of the furnace, where there was a 26-foot diameter platform. The 40-horsepower blast engine and other parts of the furnace were from another (failed) iron-sand smelting venture, the New Zealand Titanic Steel and Iron Company, which was led by Edward Smith and had erected a blast furnace at Te Henui near New Plymouth. There were also two boilers and water pumps to keep the tuyeres cool.

The blast furnace made its first pig-iron, in July 1890. It seems that the iron was made with conventional iron ore, not iron-sand. However, in early September 1890, the furnace was 'allowed to cool', reportedly as a result of insufficient coal, due to industrial trouble at the mines. But, in fact, Hughes had built a furnace that could not achieve its purpose—to smelt iron-sand. Hughes should have been aware of the previous failure of the lengthy, earlier attempt at New Plymouth, but may have drawn the wrong conclusions from its partial success in making pig-iron; the outcome was predictable.

In late October 1890, Hughes was advocating the erection of another blast furnace at Kamo near Whangārei, where there was a hematite iron ore deposit with coal and limestone nearby. He was stating publicly that Onehunga would not be able to compete with a works at Kamo. No doubt his public stance would have annoyed the proprietors of the Onehunga Ironworks, who had just recently backed the now dormant Onehunga blast furnace. By December 1890, Hughes had been sacked by Onehunga and was suing the company, and, a little later, he was trying to dispose of his shares in it. He then returned to Australia.

=== Final years (1891–1895) ===
In 1891, the Onehunga Works was a much larger plant than it had been before Enoch Hughes's management—even before the blast furnace was erected, it was claimed to be the largest ironworks in the southern hemisphere—but it was no longer smelting iron ore, let alone iron-sand.

Other operations continued during 1891, but were subject to industrial trouble as the key 'puddling' workers went on strike for higher wages. Thomas J. Heskett became manager and conducted a trial smelting of 300 tons of limonite iron ore from Onekaka on Golden Bay, in the South Island. That ore and nearby coal deposits later became the resources used by the Onekaka Ironworks, established by Heskett's grandson, John Heskett, which operated between 1924 and 1935, using conventional blast furnace technology.

By June 1892, the works had reopened and was once again aiming to smelt iron-sand and so win a government bonus payment. These efforts involved Edward Smith as a consultant. By August 1893, a bonus had been paid, but critics claimed that little if any of the marketable iron involved was smelted from local ores; one describing the efforts as "a tin-pot experiment".

In January 1894, the works closed and its workforce was dismissed, only to reopen with a new workforce from Lithgow—some of whom had worked at Onehunga previously—who intended to operate the works as a 'cooperative'. The workers, from the Eskbank Ironworks at Lithgow, had left that works in 1894 with the blessing of their employer, William Sandford, because it was short of orders. It was Sandford who had first made enquiries to the owners of the Onehunga works, in an attempt to find work for his idle workforce. It seems that the Lithgow men made a living by rolling scrap iron into bars at Onehunga, but there was difficulty in obtaining sufficient scrap iron and work was carried on part-time only. At least some of these men drifted back to Lithgow, where prospects for work had improved.

By August 1895, the Onehunga Ironworks had shut down, it seems for the last time.

=== Demise and demolition ===
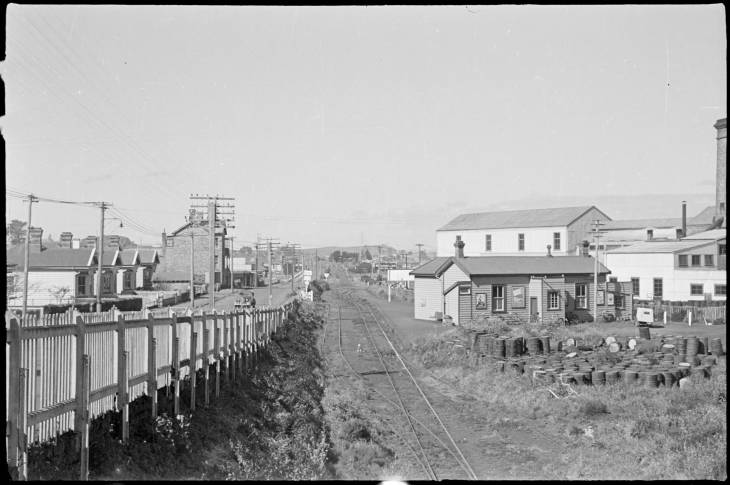
Former site of the Onehunga Ironworks in 1940s. A chimney of the ironworks appears on the right-hand edge of the image. (Photographer Marsh, Douglas Jerome, Auckland Libraries Heritage Collections 1334-020-8)

The works were sold in 1899, the buyer's intention being to relocate the rolling mills to Wellington. In 1903 there was an auction of equipment, iron and building materials—only part was sold—and it seems that the works may have been partially demolished at this time.

In the 1940s, the old ironworks site was occupied by Duroid Products (New Zealand) Limited.

The brick chimney and some structures of the Onehunga Ironworks were still standing in the late 1960s, but there is now no trace left of the old ironworks.

== Legacy ==
Other attempts to exploit New Zealand's iron-sands as iron ore also failed, until a commercially viable process—now the basis of the modern steel industry of New Zealand—was developed by the Department of Scientific and Industrial Research, during the 1950s.

Like the original process used at Onehunga from 1883 to 1887, the modern process uses direct reduction of an iron-sand and coal mixture, but the resulting 'sponge iron' is now melted in an electric arc furnace to produce molten pig-iron that is then converted to steel by conventional means.
