= William Sandford =

English-Australian ironmaster (1841–1932)

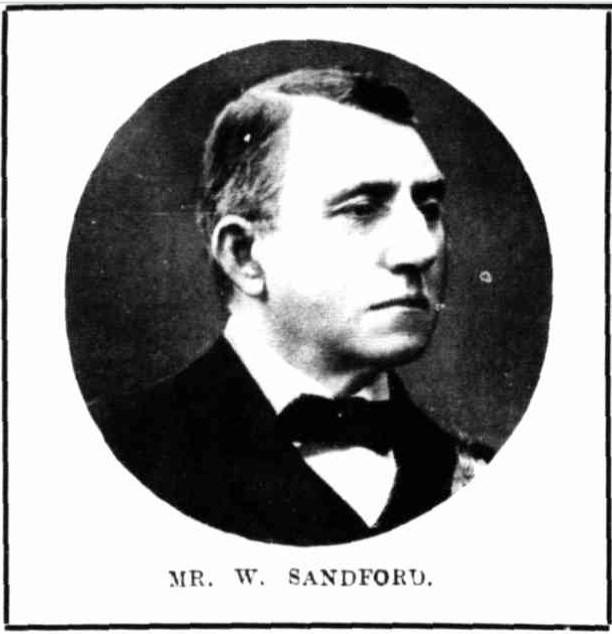
- Born: 26 September 1841; Torrington, Devon
- Died: 29 May 1932 (aged 90); Eastwood, N.S.W.
- Occupations: Iron and Steel Works Proprietor
- Known for: Pioneer of modern iron and steel industry in Australia
- Spouse(s): 1) ? 2) Caroline Newey
- Children: 5

William Sandford (26 September 1841 – 29 May 1932) was an English-Australian ironmaster, who is widely regarded as the father of the modern iron and steel industry in Australia.

== Early life in England ==
Sandford was born at Torrington in Devon and became an accountant, eventually becoming manager of Ashton Gate Iron Rolling Mills.

== Early years in Australia ==
In 1883, he moved to Sydney, employed to organise a wire-netting factory, at what was then part of Five Dock now Chiswick, NSW. At the time of his first involvement in the colonial iron industry, his later views on providing import protection and increasing local manufacturing were already formed.

After visiting Lithgow, he became enthusiastic about the local iron industry and tried to persuade his English employers to buy the Eskbank Ironworks.

He left the wire netting factory, and set up a company (the Fitzroy Iron Company), leased the Fitzroy Iron Works at Mittagong in March 1886—in order to re-roll rails—and commenced production there in August 1886. Initially, Enoch Hughes—another pioneer of the Australian iron industry—was his manager at Mittagong. While there, he had made what was probably the first galvanised iron sheet manufactured using sheet iron rolled in Australia, around September 1886.

== Lithgow ==
=== Lessee (1887–1891) ===
The rolling mill at Mittagong proved unsuitable and Sandford relocated his operations, in 1887, to the rolling mills of the Eskbank Ironworks at Lithgow, which he leased for the purpose from James Rutherford.

He bought a 2000 acre property at Bowenfels, to the west of Lithgow, and added a second story to the existing house, creating an 11-room home, which he later named 'Eskroy Park'

=== Ownership, expansion, and tariff protection (1892–1900) ===
In 1892, Sandford purchased the Eskbank Ironworks, using money loaned by the Commercial Banking Company of Sydney, and was given a government contract in railway parts. It was a brave move, at a time when Australia was enduring a serious economic downturn. Moreover, he began expanding the plant, in the expectation that protection against imports would be forthcoming.

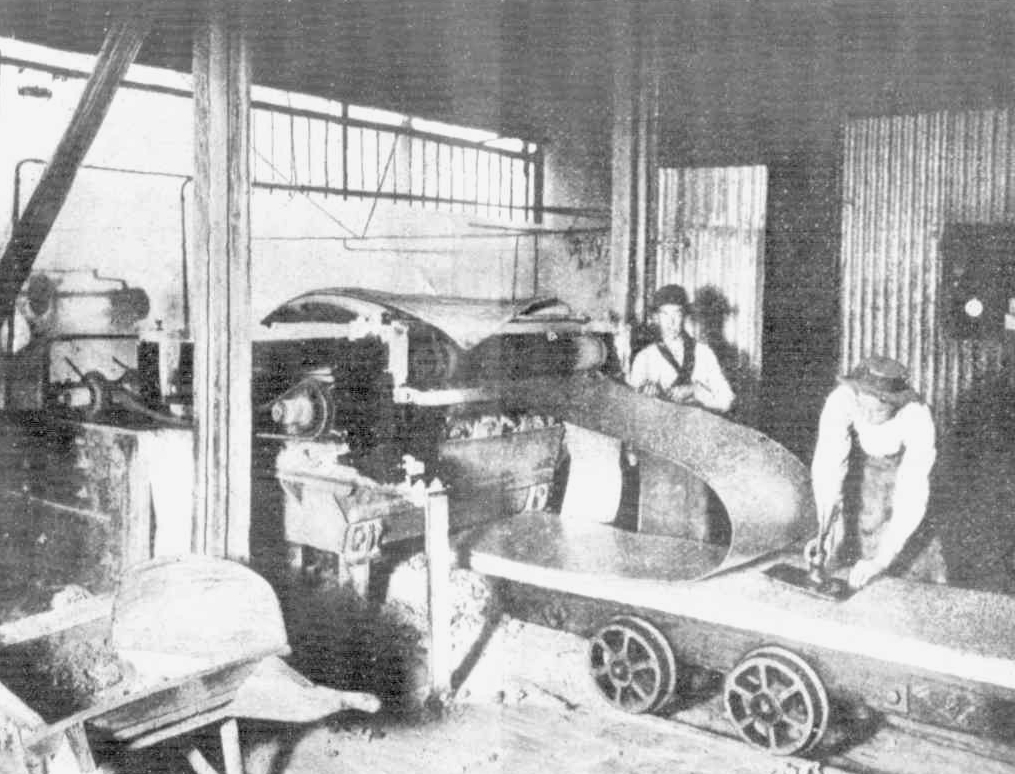
Galvanising machine c.1903

Around the time he purchased the Eskbank works, Sandford became a vigorous protectionist, leading the Lithgow National Protection Association. The issue of protection against imports was the principal political division of late 19th-century Australia. In New South Wales, almost alone of the Australian colonies, there was widespread support for free trade. A growing force was the Labor Party; it somewhat favoured protection, as a means to maintain relatively high wages, but also advocated nationalisation of major industries, complicating its policy toward enterprises like Sandford's. However, at the 1891 election, it was the protectionists who won office in New South Wales.

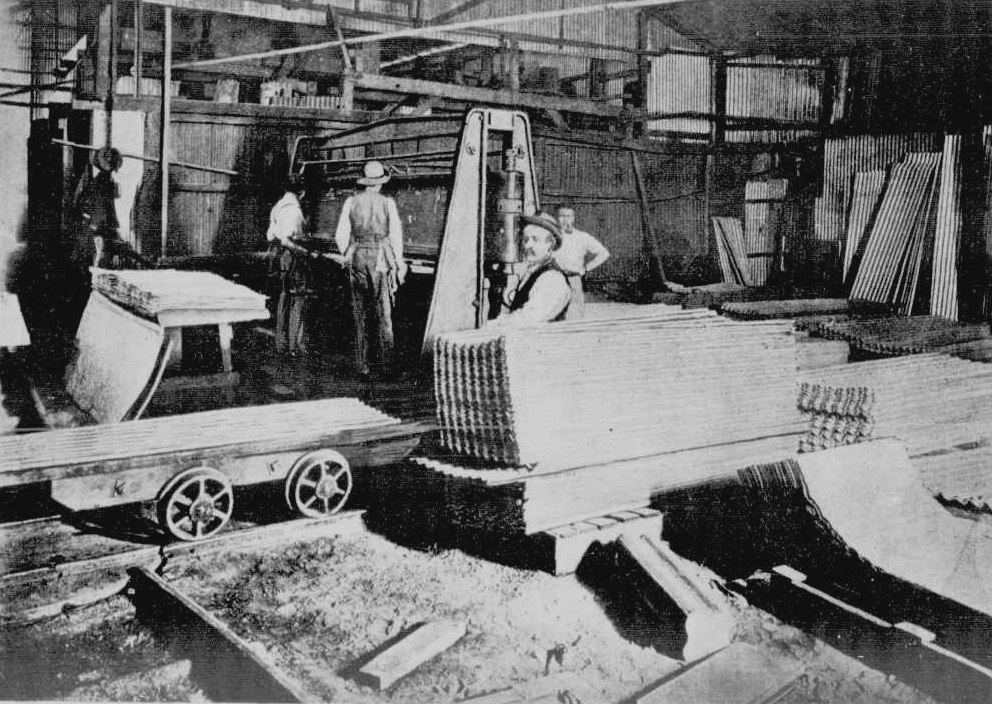
Corrugating iron c.1903

A tariff on imported iron was applied by George Dibb's Protectionist government in New South Wales, between 1893 and when it was abolished by the incoming Free Trade government of George Reid in 1895. The tariff had encouraged Sandford to further expand his plant and its abolition was a crucial blow. It threatened the viability of Sandford's new sheet mill and galvanizing plant, which made galvanized corrugated iron sheets. Largely as a result of this experience, Sandford became an implacable opponent of Reid, and stood unsuccessfully, in 1896, as the protectionist candidate for the New South Wales Legislative Assembly seat of Hartley.

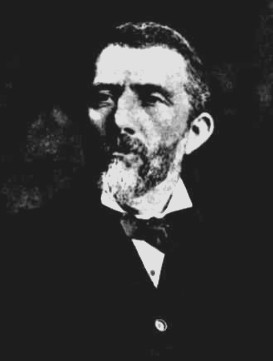
Sandford in 1897

Free traders were not opposed to a local iron and steel industry; their view was that it could come about, without a protective tariff. The N.S.W Government had offered a large contract for locally made steel rails. A leading free trade businessman and politician, Joseph Mitchell—like Sandford, a strong and tireless advocate for a local iron and steel industry—won the contract, in 1897, but died before he could build his planned large iron and steel works near Wallerawang. Sandford had not tendered; his view was that, without protection, local industry could not compete. Another company G & C Hoskins—owned by brothers George and Charles Hoskins—did tender, unsuccessfully.

In 1899, Sandford attempted to interest his friend Charles Hoskins in buying the Eskbank works but the offer was declined.

=== Federation, first steel, expansion, Bonus Bill, and Arbitration Court (1901–1904) ===
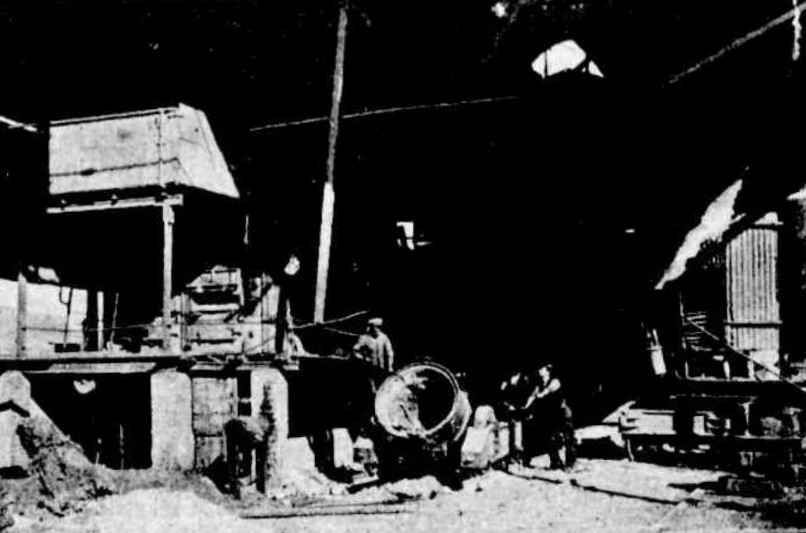
Steel furnace c.1901.

With Federation, in 1901, tariffs and duties between the colonies were abolished and the matter of import protection came one for the new Commonwealth of Australia to decide at a national level. With the election of a Protectionist minority government in the new Australian House of Representative, Sandford became optimistic that protection for the iron and steel industry would be forthcoming.

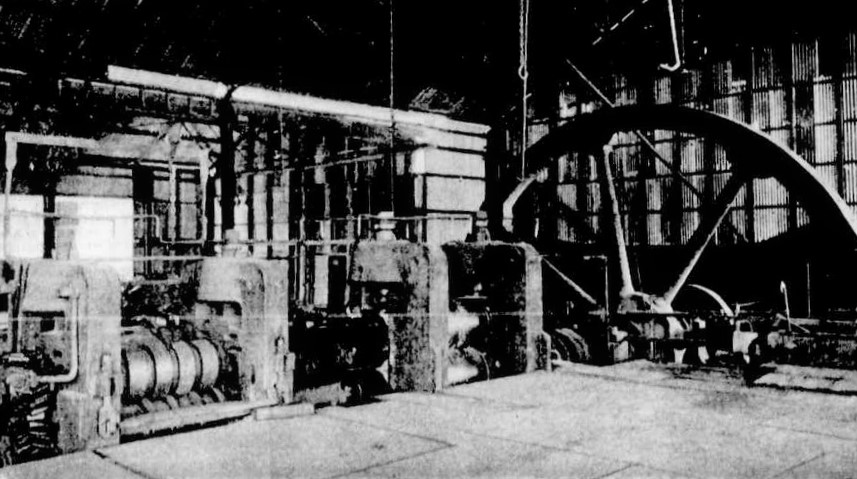
Sheet mill c.1902.

In 1901, he set up William Sandford Limited as a public company—although Sandford himself owned nearly all the shares—and in that same year, Lithgow first produced steel, Although Sandford's Lithgow works was not the first to produce steel in Australia, it was the first to do so in large quantities by using the Siemens-Martin Open Hearth process. The feedstock was either scrap or imported pig iron, since no iron had been smelted in Australia since 1884, when the blast furnace at Lal Lal closed; the original (1875) Lithgow blast furnace had closed in 1882. Also in 1901, he put into operation a new sheet mill.

Sandford, confident that protection—under the Bonus Bill, an act of the new Australian Parliament—was imminent, went to England. He returned in June 1902, with news that he would raise £750,000 of British capital and float a new company, Australasian Iron and Steel Corporation Limited, and hosted an English visitor associated with these plans. He stated that "The intention of the new corporation is to extend the works. Their expansion will materially depend on the confirmation of the Bonus Bill by the Federal Senate, so far as it applies to iron made from Australian ores, and the confirmation of the tariff with respect to iron manufactures."

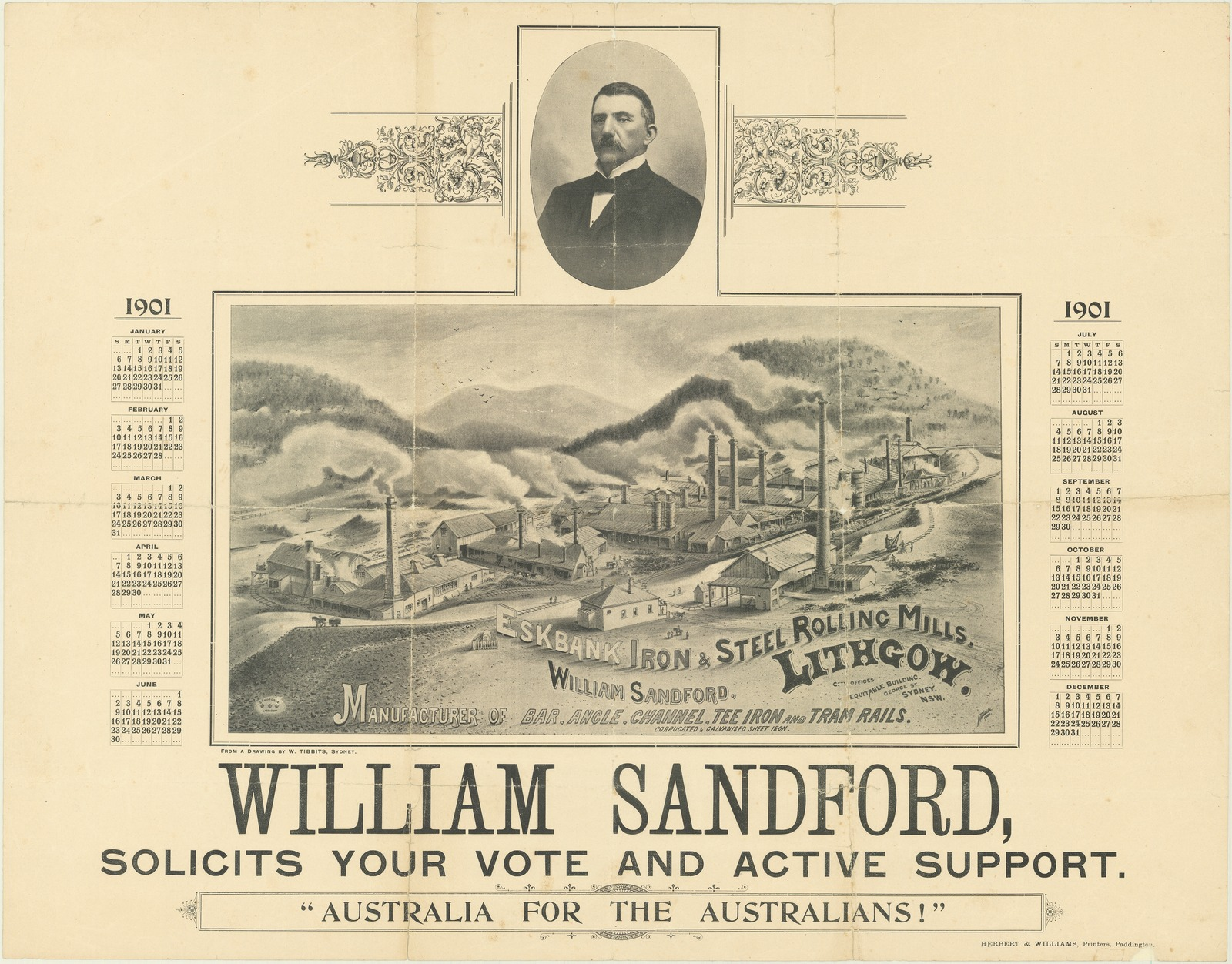
William Sandford - Political advertising, as Protectionist candidate, for 1901 election.(State Library of Victoria)

However, his return to Australia coincided with the effective defeat of the Bonus Bill. Edmund Barton's Protectionist minority government relied upon the Labor Party to pass any legislation. Labor had combined with the opposition Free Trade Party—led by Sandford's Free Trade nemesis, George Reid—to amend the legislation in such a way that caused it to provide less protection than had been expected. Labor wanted a nationalised iron and steel industry and did not want to stimulate the further growth of a privately owned one.

Although Sandford was feted upon his return to Lithgow, his plan for a new and well-capitalised company to expand the Lithgow works was stymied. In 1903, Sandford had to close the sheet mills at Lithgow altogether but continued to make galvanized iron using imported sheets.

Sandford had begun to face financial difficulties due to rising costs, uncertain markets and scarcity of material, and—in his own view—the absence of protection against import competition. He had contested the first federal election, in March 1901, as a Protectionist candidate for Parramatta, but was defeated by Joseph Cook. In 1903, he again ran for the federal parliament, this time against Free Trader Sydney Smith in Macquarie, but he was again unsuccessful.

In 1904, William Sandford Limited settled two disputes with its employees in the N.S.W. Arbitration Court.

=== State contract, blast furnace, and first integrated steelworks (1905–1907) ===
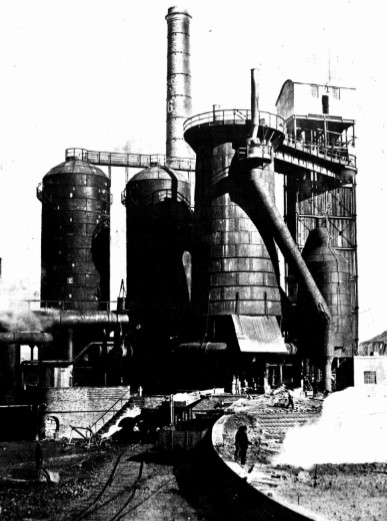
The new blast furnace, in May 1907.

As steamships came to replace sailing ships, cheap pig iron, in the form of ballast, was being imported less. On a steamship, pig iron would be carried as paid cargo. With a sizable local market, making iron in Australia was becoming more viable.

Sandford and his manager William Thornley were confident in the future of the Lithgow works—provided it had protection—and in 1905 it was making steel fishplates—but not yet rails—for the NSWGR; it also manufactured corrugated galvanised steel sheet, but struggled to do so profitably.

By 1905, Sandford was a wealthy man, with audited personal assets of £141,000, even if much of this wealth was invested in the ironworks. He lived at an estate known as 'Eskroy Park' near Bowenfels, and his ownership of a colliery and land sales in Lithgow gave him income that was more reliable than that coming from the ironworks.

Premier Joseph Carruthers (a Free Trader) persuaded him to agree to William Sandford Limited contracting to supply all of the New South Wales Government's needs for iron and steel, for a seven year period, in 1905. Most of this steel would be in the form of heavy steel rails for railways. A condition of that contract was that local iron ore, coal and limestone were to be used to produce iron, necessitating the erection of a blast furnace.

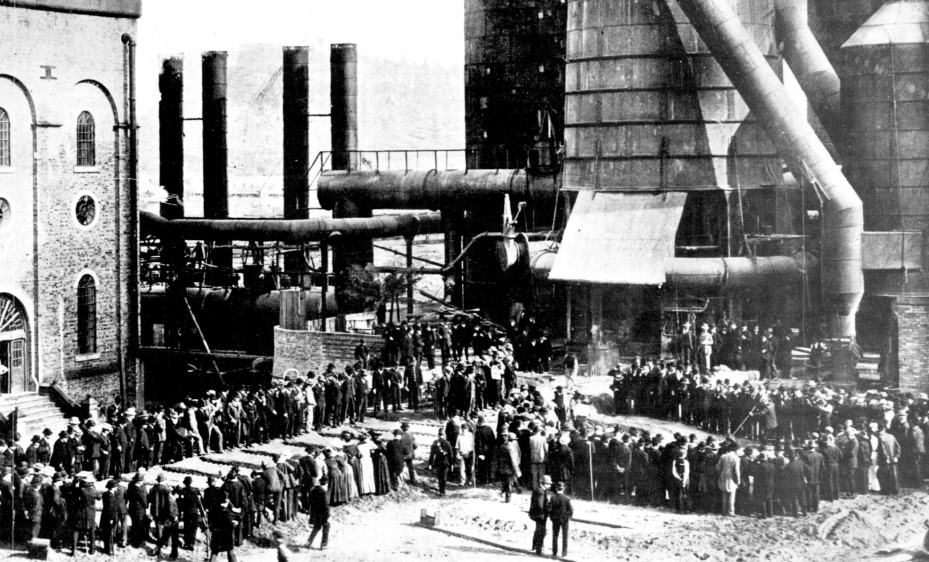
Guests watch the tapping of molten iron at the official opening of the blast furnace, 13 May 1907.

Sandford embarked on a major expansion, starting with the construction of a large modern blast furnace. On 30 April 1907, his daughter, Clarice, started the blast of the new furnace, and Sandford's proudest moment was when it was officially opened on 13 May 1907. As part of the same expansion, a new 15-ton Open Hearth furnace was added to make steel from the pig-iron, a new fishplate mill commenced operation in 1906, and a short rail branch line laid to the iron ore mine at Coombing Park near Carcoar. The Lithgow works had become the first integrated iron and steel works in Australia.

Sandford had built his new blast furnace some distance from the steelmaking furnaces at the Eskbank works, which has been criticised as a poor decision. However, it was intended to be only the first of four such blast furnaces, feeding a new and larger steelmaking facility nearby, which in turn would feed a line of new rolling mills. Sandford had the general layout of this new plant designed by English consulting engineers, J.H. Harrison, based on earlier advice from an English expert, Enoch James. These plans are proof of the grand vision that Sandford had for Lithgow; his problem was how he could fund it.

A proportion of the iron production was destined to be railed to Sydney for use in manufacture of cast iron products, such as pipes, and the location of the furnace near to the main railway line was logical from that standpoint. However, prior to the foreshadowed expansion, any molten iron destined for steel production needed to be cast into pigs, taken in solid form to the steelmaking plant, and then remelted—a thermally inefficient arrangement that increased steelmaking costs, compared to moving the iron in molten form.

Sandford had constructed the new blast furnace seemingly on his own account—later it was reported that he had used a bank loan of £63,500 to fund it, not his own money—but it was the company William Sandford Limited that held the contract with the government. During the time between the furnace first being lit and the official opening, the company purchased the new furnace and its site from Sandford, paying him £75,683, in the form of 50,000 shares £1 in the company, with the balance to fall due in May 1914 and attracting interest at 5% in the meantime. That arrangement did not really relieve the enormous financial pressure on Sandford personally; it tied his fate more closely to that of the company bearing his name and its ability to fulfill its government contract.

=== Failure of William Sandford Limited ===
In debt after such a rapid expansion and under-capitalised, the company was in urgent need of more capital. It needed still more capital to carry out the vision for a larger works. During a visit to England in 1905, Sandford started negotiations with his former employer, John Lysaght Limited, of Bristol, England, with the aim that Lysaghts would take a stake in the Lithgow works and inject capital. These negotiations went on for 20 months, with Lysaghts prepared to provide most of the necessary capital, but finally broke down over Sandford's insistence of remaining in absolute control. His rejection of this financial lifeline, in June 1907, left him and his company in a dire situation.

Beginning around September 1906, Sandford had shown signs of a deteriorating mental state. During this time, his competent and reliable General Manager, William Thornley, was a steadying influence. However, ultimate authority lay with Sandford, who had become increasingly more eccentric and unpredictable. His anxiety was clouding his ability to think clearly, work properly with his managers, and make good decisions. His compulsion to retain personal control is difficult to understand, given his advancing age; he seems to have been hoping that one of his sons could take the helm, if he had more time, or perhaps he was obsessed with delivering his grand vision himself.

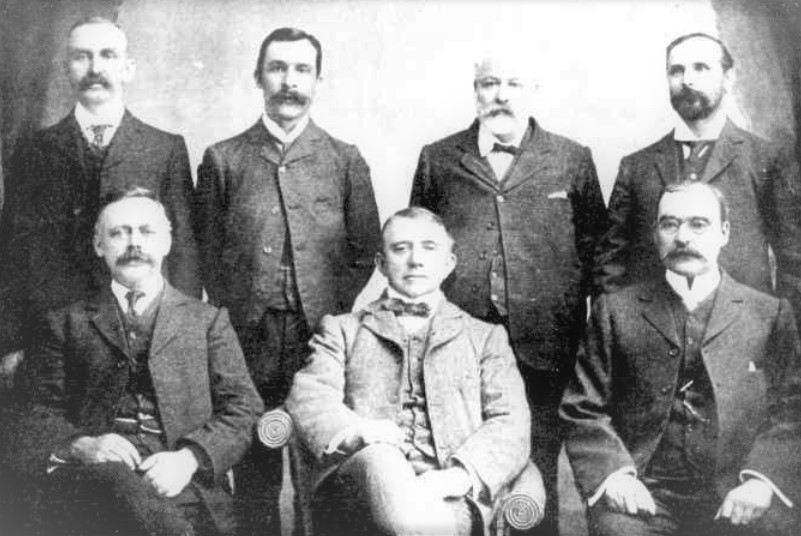
Directors of William Sandford Ltd in May 1907. Sandford is centre of the front row, with General Manager, William Thornley, seated on the left. Sandford's son Roy is either absent or only became a director later in 1907. Another of Sandford's sons, John Sandford, Jun., was also a director by September 1907.

The company's board—made up as it was of Sandford (as Chairman), two of his sons, managers and close associates of Sandford— resolved to raise additional capital of £100,000 in the form of new £1 shares in June 1907, The company issued a prospectus—making no mention of profit or loss—in late September 1907, with 118,093 new shares on offer. This would be only the second raising of capital to be paid in cash; the other being £18,807 raised at the formation of the company in 1901. Most of the existing paid up shares had been issued to William Sandford, in exchange for assets that had been transferred to company ownership. Of the existing 73,807 shares, 51,001 were held by Sandford himself, and his family and associates also held shares. Sandford was to receive still more shares as payment for the blast furnace.

Doubters later pointed to the risk of investing in an under-capitalised company, with a board controlled by Sandford, with the management run by Sandford, and in which the bulk of the already issued shares were in the hands of Sandford himself—who stood to benefit greatly if the company obtained new capital—and to Sandford having taken recent decisions to buy assets for the company, from himself, on favourable terms. William Sandford Limited was a public company in name but was run more like a private family company. There was also a view that the raising was intended to get the bank out of its predicament, using money from the public to pay down the company's borrowings.

Charles Hoskins applied for 10,000 of the shares but changed his mind when he saw the books of the company. There had been no real attempt made to interest large investors in taking up shares. Applications closed on 14 October 1907. The raising was a failure, with applications for only 18,599 shares—a significant portion were shares allocated to directors—and the money raised was returned to subscribers.

The main commercial banking creditor, Commercial Banking Co. of Sydney, refused to lend more money by overdraft in October 1907. William Sandford Limited needed working capital (£25,000) just to continue operation and cash (£45,000) to complete the enhancements to the plant. The erection of an imported 24-inch mill, needed to roll rails, had yet to be completed. Sandford claimed to have made a successful test run of the new mill on 19 October 1907. Moreover, economic operation of the mill would require the addition of live rolls and another two 15-ton steel furnaces, to keep it supplied with enough steel. That came to £45,000, once other items such as cranes and a duplication of the sheet mill were added.

It was apparent, by the end of November 1907, that the company was failing to meet deliveries under the Government's seven year iron and steel contract. A report to the NSW Legislative Assembly noted that, "It has been demonstrated beyond question that the Company’s existing plant is quite inadequate to carry out all of the Government orders. Many incomplete orders have remained on hand for months, and urgent reminders have frequently been sent by the Comptroller of Stores, Railway Department. Owing to delays, contract scheduled items have been indented from England, and other orders under contract have had to be placed elsewhere." The same report noted, " the works are at the crucial point where equipment as well as conditions promise a profitable career, provided sufficient capital permits a continuation, but where necessarily also want of such capital means absolute disaster as far as the present proprietary is concerned."

Sandford appealed to the N.S.W. Government for assistance. The Premier, Charles Wade, offered an advance of £70,000, as a loan to the company, under stringent conditions, and with the agreement of the bank not to call in its existing loan to Sandford and to reduce the rate of interest on its loan. The nature of the arrangement necessitated that it be ratified by the N.S.W. Parliament. Prior to offering the loan, a comprehensive report on the company and its prospects was prepared, which was tabled in the Legislative Assembly. The bank stated that, even if the Government loan went through, it would not lend further money to the company above the existing overdraft limit.

After debating the issue all night, the N.S.W. Parliament passed legislation ratifying the loan, in early hours of 5 December 1907, but a last minute amendment—moved by the Labor Party, leader, James McGowan, who favoured a nationalised steel industry—made the government loan take absolute precedence of security, over existing commercial loans.

The final form of the legislation alarmed the bank, which then withdrew its tentative agreement to support Sandford, demanded full repayment of the overdraft amount, and took over the assets on 9 December 1907. Only the new blast furnace was kept in operation, to prevent its destruction if it were to cool. 700 workers became idle.

=== Hoskins take over ===
Sandford's shares became essentially worthless and he faced financial ruin, at the age of 66. After years of great mental stress, he was a broken man.

The Lithgow works was too large an employer and economic asset to be allowed to close down. Sandford met Premier Wade on 11 December 1907, but that would be his last involvement. Other discussions took place, concerning the future of the works, between the bank, the N.S.W Government, and the firm of G & C Hoskins, and a plan was formulated, without Sandford's involvement. There was, however, public pressure to ensure that Sandford's pioneering role in the industry was recognised by ensuring he was not ruined financially. There was also great concern, about the future of Lithgow and the existing investments in housing and infrastructure there.

Left with little choice, on 19 December 1907, Sandford reluctantly accepted the offer from G & C Hoskins to take over his enterprise. Summing up his position he stated, " I have only the satisfaction of knowing that the object of my life has been attained, and I have demonstrated that good merchantable pig iron can be made from the Australian raw materials".

The Eskbank Ironworks and its near new blast furnace were taken over by the Hoskins Brothers (G & C Hoskins) in 1908. Under the complicated deal, the Hoskins took over the overdraft of £138,000 owing to the bank, paid £14,000 to shareholders of William Sandford Limited in the form of 4 per cent bonds, and paid £50,000 to Sandford himself—ensuring Sandford's future financial security. Sandford would lose his home and possessions at 'Eskroy Park'. The Hoskins Brothers had outlaid £202,000 for the assets and nobody but Sandford himself had lost any money. He expressed some satisfaction with that outcome, stating that, "I have come down, but I have dragged nobody with me". William Sandford Limited was wound up in early 1908.

=== Lithgow after Sandford ===
The long-sought protection of the iron and steel industry was finally introduced, from the first day of 1909, by Andrew Fisher's Labor government, in the form of bounties to be paid under the new Manufacturers' Encouragement Act, which made it a condition that those benefitting from bounties would pay "fair and reasonable wages". The new legislation came too late to save Sandford, but the bounties alone probably would not have been enough to turn around the Lithgow operations in the manner Charles Hoskins would do by 1914.

G & C Hoskins had been a large customer of William Sandford Limited—using pig iron in their iron pipe foundry in Sydney—and one of the very few outside shareholders of William Sandford Limited. Charles Hoskins was one of Sandford's closest friends and a fellow protectionist. Despite this relationship and the apparent generosity of Hoskins' settlement with Sandford, unkind and ungracious public remarks—about Sandford and his management of the Lithgow plant— resulted in a bitter public dispute between Sandford and Charles Hoskins during August 1911.

Even after he had left the industry and Lithgow, Sandford continued to be an advocate for the iron and steel industry at Lithgow and to defend his role in it, of which he was proud.

=== Workforce relations ===
Sandford had been popular and widely respected in Lithgow as a relatively benevolent employer, who had the interests of his workers at heart. In 1893, when orders at Lithgow were slack, he obtained work for some of his employees at the Onehunga Ironworks in New Zealand. He provided cheap land for his workers and assistance to build their houses, including providing house designs and guaranteeing their bank loans.

He had engaged his workers by contract with an element of profit sharing; an arrangement which he advocated and in which he took some personal pride. When the subsequent owners, G & C Hoskins attempted to change these employment arrangements to day labour, it began a series of bitter and sometimes violent strikes and lock outs lasting almost four years.

Sandford expressed frustration that he had been forced to set up an iron and steel industry "without duties or a bonus"—something he himself saw as an impossibility—and he believed himself to have failed. This and the concern he held for his workforce explained much of the mental anguish that characterised his later years at Lithgow.

== Legacy ==
Sandford is viewed, justifiably, as the father of the iron and steel industry in Australia. His greatest achievement was to operate and expand the Eskbank Ironworks at Lithgow, between 1887 and 1907—first as lessee and from 1892 as owner—albeit that, in the end, it fell to others to make it viable. It became the first integrated iron and steel works in Australia, while under Sandford's ownership and management. The plant at Lithgow was further expanded, under G & C Hoskins ownership. Between 1928 and 1932, the iron and steel making operations at Lithgow were relocated to Port Kembla, where steel is still made today, by BlueScope.

The wire netting factory that Sandford established at Chiswick in 1884—owned first by Lysaght and later by Australian Wire Industries, a subsidiary of BHP—was later expanded, and survived until 1998, as Sydney Wire Mill.

Many of Sandford's managers and workforce stayed on at the Lithgow works under the new management and were part of the growth of the iron and steel industry in the following decades. His General Manager, William Thornley, left Lithgow and set up an iron and steel foundry, W. Thornley and Sons, at Sydenham, in Sydney, to make railway equipment. It later also made commercial woodworking machine tools.

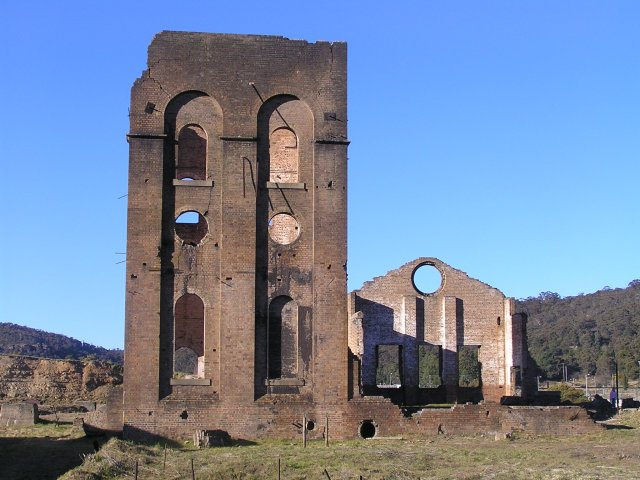
Ruin of the blower house of Sandford's blast furnace at Lithgow, opened in 1907. It closed in 1928, when blast furnace operations were moved to Port Kembla.

The ruin of the blower house of Sandford's blast furnace still stands in what is now the Blast Furnace Park, Lithgow. Sandford's home, 'Eskroy Park'—later the home of Charles Hoskins— is now part of the clubhouse of the Lithgow Golf Club, and the surrounding land that he once owned is now the golf course. The collection of the Powerhouse Museum, includes an iron pig, cast on the day that Sandford's blast furnace was opened. There is a marble bust of Sandford in the collection of Eskbank House Museum at Lithgow.

Sandford was associated with the growth of the township of Lithgow. The area between Railway Parade and Read Street, bounded by Roy Street and the laneway behind John Street was subdivided by Sandford for housing in 1897 and, in 1902, Spooner and Harley Streets were added. Roy, Clarice and John Streets are named after Sandford's children. Sandford Avenue in Lithgow is named after him. The continuation of Main Street, west of the Great Western Highway is Caroline Avenue, likely named after Caroline Sandford, his wife.

Sandford Street in Mitchell, an industrial suburb of Canberra—the streets of which are named after Australian industrialists—is named after him, as is the Sandford Street light rail stop.

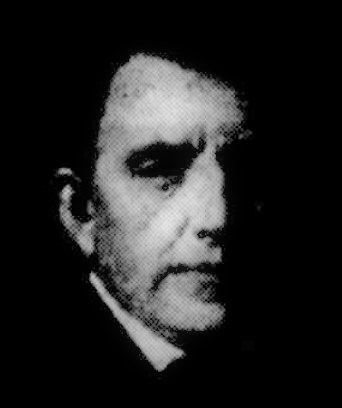
Photograph of part of the portrait, painted by Norman Carter.

Sandford's life-size portrait—painted by Norman St Clair Carter, paid from funds raised by public subscription in 1908—has a chequered history. It hung for 30 years in the Art Gallery in Sydney, until his daughter was requested to take it away in 1938. It then hung at the Chamber of Manufacturers until 1951, when it moved to the Sydney boardroom of John Lysaght Australia. Presumably when that company was taken over by BHP, it moved to the offices of the Port Kembla steelworks (now BlueScope).

William Sandford was an enigma; an industrialist who felt more at home with nature; a capitalist just as concerned for his workers' wages as his own personal fortune; a businessman comfortable with a Labor government and state ownership of industry; someone wracked by self doubt and inner turmoil, but who was well respected and liked, almost universally; someone honourable but still capable of deceit on occasion; someone proud of his ability to recruit talented, knowledgeable, and loyal people, but who became obsessive over retaining personal control, and a visionary who lacked confidence but nonetheless pursued it, almost to the point of self destruction.

== Later life ==
Exhausted by the failure of his business, Sandford retired.

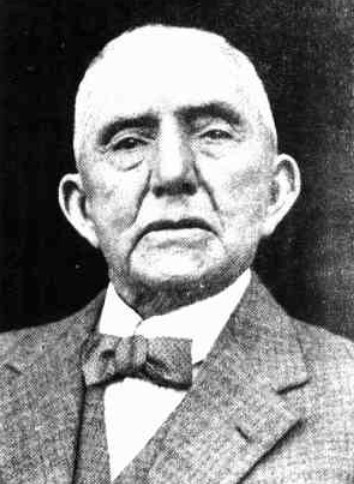
Sandford at 90.

He left Lithgow in early 1908—making a trip to England soon afterwards—and lived first at Darling Point, naming his residence 'Torrington', before moving in 1911 to an orchard in Castle Hill, which he named 'Sandford Glen'. He sold the orchard in May 1920 and moved to Eastwood. A keen gardener, he retained good health and vitality into old age.

When Sandford visited Lithgow in 1922, it was as an honoured guest and he received an official civic reception. He attended the service for his old friend and later foe, Charles Hoskins, who died in February 1926. Some of his old associates continued to visit him, including for his 90th birthday in 1931.

He lived long enough to see protection of the iron and steel industries introduced by the Labor government of Andrew Fisher, the first steel rails made at Lithgow in 1911, establishment of a rival steelworks at Newcastle in 1915, establishment of a new listed company Australian Iron & Steel in May 1928, commencement of blast furnace operation at Port Kembla in August 1928, and the gradual closure and relocation to Port Kembla of the Hoskins' works at Lithgow, between November 1928 and January 1932.

== Family ==
Sandford had somewhat complicated family arrangements. He had left two children by a previous marriage in England, but he married Caroline Newey on 3 May 1884 at Goulburn. Caroline was 15 years his junior and herself had a previous marriage. Sandford's first wife was alive in England for at least twenty years after he emigrated.

He had three children with Caroline. The children had a privileged upbringing at Eskroy Park, before being sent away to boarding school. In 1895, the two elder children and their mother each had their own horse.

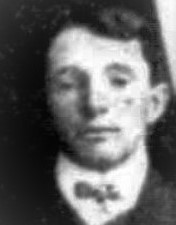
Roy in 1907.

The eldest Australian-born child was his daughter, Clarice Adele Sandford (b.1885 d.1977)—a pupil of Julian Ashton—who studied in London and became an artist; she appears to have been a travelling companion and a carer for her parents in their old age. She was an Archibald Prize finalist for the years 1923 and 1937. Despite some interest in her works in the 1990s, as an artist, she is now largely, but not entirely, forgotten.

His elder Australian-born son, William Fitzroy Sandford (b.1886 d.1948)—known throughout his life as Roy William Sandford—became first an assistant manager at Lithgow in charge of the steel furnaces, and later a director and the interstate salesman for the company. After the company failed, he was an importer of American motor cars and local manufacturer of car bodies and car parts, during the 1910s and 1920s. Roy Sandford put this venture—Roy W. Sandford Limited—into voluntary liquidation in late 1929. After that, he was a car dealer. Roy's marriage ended in divorce in 1914, and it seems his later life was troubled.

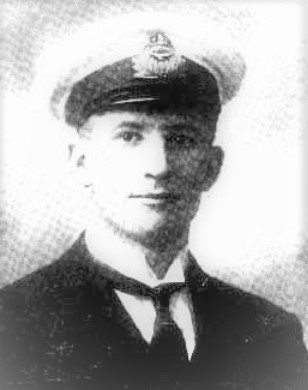
Esk in 1916.

His other Australian-born son, Frederick Esk Sandford, AFC (b. 1890 d.1928)—known as Esk Sandford—an engineering graduate of Sydney University, who survived war service in German New Guinea and in the Royal Naval Air Service, was an officer in the Air Force, when he died after a motor car accident in 1928. Esk was the second husband of pioneering New Zealand driver and aviator, Gladys Sandford. Their marriage was not a success, but Gladys retained his family name after they separated. Esk himself is recognised as a pioneer of aviation in New Zealand, making flights and surviving a crash there, in 1913.

The middle names, Fitzroy and Esk, that Sandford gave to his two sons are the after the names of the ironworks that Sandford was running, at the time that each of his sons was born, the Fitzroy Iron Works and the Eskbank Ironworks respectively.

Sandford retained contact with his brother Robert, who remained in Torrington, Devon, and owned a butter factory. Another brother was John Sandford, Senior, who visited Lithgow from the U.S.A. in 1900. By June 1903, he was living at Sausalito—having taken over the Geneva Hotel there not long before it was demolished in 1904—and later was at St. Helena, running the White Sulphur Springs Hotel, when it was destroyed by fire in August 1905. The Sandford brothers all seem to have held far grander business ambitions than any of them were to achieve.

Later in life, Sandford was reconciled with the son of his first marriage, John (or Jack) Sandford—also known as John Sandford, Junior. John came out to Lithgow with his wife and lived there for a number of years, while employed as the ironworks manager, causing some tension in the family. Later he returned to England, where he became his father's overseas agent. He and his wife came back to Lithgow in July 1907. Ostensibly, he was visiting only for a few months. John was a director of William Sandford Limited and acting works manager, around the time that the company finally failed.

== Death ==
William Sandford died on 29 May 1932, aged 90, at his home, 'Iona', 16 Ethel Street, Eastwood, only months after the last of the Lithgow steelworks operations finally closed. He was survived by his second wife, Caroline, a daughter and one of his two sons by Caroline, and a daughter and a son from his earlier English marriage. His will only recognised his Australian-born children by Caroline. Caroline died in 1934.

Sandford's modest grave lies in the Anglican section of the Macquarie Park (formerly Northern Suburbs General) Cemetery. His epitaph reads, "Pioneer of Iron & Steel Industry." He lies with his wife, Caroline, and nearby lie the graves of two of his children, Frederick (Esk) and Clarice. His other son, Roy, was cremated.

== See also ==
- Lithgow Blast Furnace
- Fitzroy Iron Works
- Charles Hoskins
