= James Rutherford (Australian pioneer) =

Australian transport pioneer

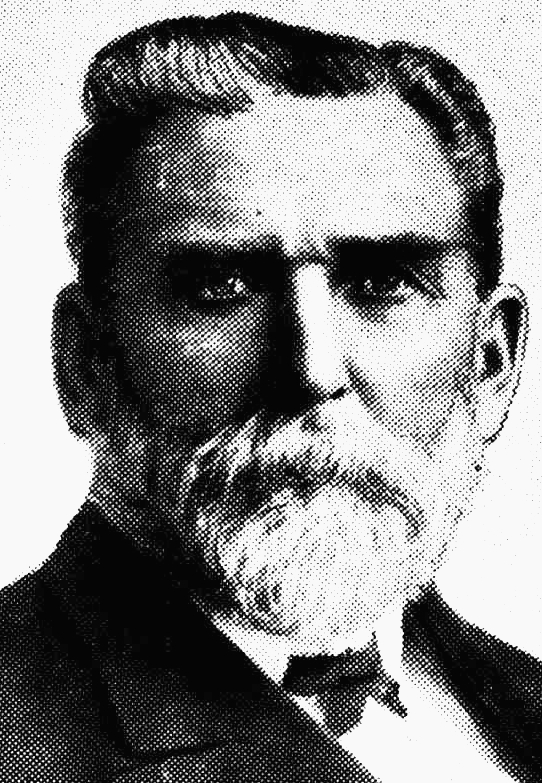
- Rutherford c. 1910
- Born: 24 October 1827; Amherst, New York, US
- Died: 13 September 1911 (aged 83); Mackay, Queensland, Australia
- Occupation: Transport businessman
- Spouse: Ada née Nicholson
- Children: 5 sons, 5 daughters
- Parent(s): James Rutherford, and Hetty née Milligan

James Rutherford (24 October 1827 – 13 September 1911) was a transport pioneer in Australia, notably Cobb & Co. His business skills with Cobb & Co. were such it was said the company should have been called Rutherford & Co.

== Early life ==
Rutherford was born in Amherst, Erie County, New York, United States, second son of James Rutherford and his wife Hetty, née Milligan.

First a school-teacher, then c. 1852 he decided to try his luck in the California Gold Rush, where his brother was. Unable to find a ship to take him there, Rutherford instead decided to travel to Australia for the Victorian gold rush.

== Australia ==
Rutherford arrived at Melbourne on the Akbar on 20 June 1853 and worked on the Bendigo goldfields for a short time, before becoming a contractor timber-cutter near Ferntree Gully, Victoria. Rutherford then sailed to Brisbane and travelled overland back to Melbourne and on the way learnt a great deal about the country, and much about its horses, in which he traded for some years.

=== Stage coaching ===
The coaching business of Cobb & Co., which had been founded by some visitors from America a few years before, was in 1857 in the hands of Cyrus Hewitt and George Watson, who employed Rutherford to manage the Beechworth line in the Victorian colony. In 1861 Rutherford formed a syndicate (including Walter Russell Hall and Alexander William Robertson) and bought out Hewitt and Watson for the sum of £23,000 (in excess of A$2.5M in 2020).

Rutherford became general manager and the business steadily expanded. Reorganising the Victorian services, he also secured a mail delivery contract monopoly in the colony. He was an excellent manager, a fine judge of horses and men, and maintained good relations between the management and the employees.

=== Bathurst ===
After initial protests by his partners, in June 1862 Rutherford moved ten coaches from the Castlemaine Depot in Victoria to Bathurst, New South Wales and re-established the company's headquarters there. It remained headquartered in Bathurst for fifty years. Extensions into Queensland were made in 1865, and the growth of the business was so great that by 1870, 6,000 horses were harnessed each day and the coaches were travelling 28,000 miles (45,062 km) a week.

At Bathurst, Rutherford became a member of the council, had a term as mayor in 1868, and was treasurer to the agricultural society for thirty years. He encouraged the planting of trees in the town, and exercised an open-handed philanthropy. Rutherford also was a strong supporter of the Bathurst Hospital as patron, the School of Arts, and warden and trustee of the town's Anglican Church.

During his long period as governing director of Cobb and Co., he kept in touch with his large station-properties, riding large distances as a young man, and later often travelling in a kind of Cape cart. His Bathurst estate was Hereford, as well as possessing Wyagdon (near Peel, NSW), Murrumbidgee (near Dubbo, NSW), Barrenbella (near Cunnamulla, Queensland), Connemarra and Warkon (on the Condamine River, Queensland), Aubathata (near Charleville, Queensland), and the large cattle stations of Davenport Downs and Ingledoon (on the Diamantina River, Queensland). He had possessed Buckingay (Nyngan, NSW) from 1864 until his death. Rutherford was considered to be one of the largest property owners across NSW and Queensland, used current management and industrial techniques.

=== Lithgow iron ===
In 1873, with John Sutherland, ironmaster Enoch Hughes, and others he founded the Eskbank Ironworks at Lithgow. This started with a capital of £100,000, all of which was exhausted after Rutherford took over its management; to which he raised another £100,000 (totalling in excess of A$22M in 2020). Rutherford succeeded in making the ironworks pay its way, but there was little profit in it and the business was eventually sold to William Sandford.

== Final years ==
In December 1863 in Victoria, Rutherford married Ada Nicholson.

Even in his eighties he continued the supervision of his stations, and he died of bronchitis and heart failure at Mackay, Queensland, on 13 September 1911 when returning from a visit to one of them. He left a widow, five sons, and five daughters. One of his sons, Dr A. H. Rutherford was the medical practitioner in Casino, New South Wales for many years, two were graziers, one electrical engineer; and one daughter a medical doctor in Sydney. Rutherford's body was transferred from Mackay to Sydney then by train to Bathurst, the funeral was conducted at All Saints' Cathedral, hymns by the choir, included a mayor as pallbearer, before he was placed in the family vault.

At the time of his death, he was the sole remaining original partner of the Cobb & Co. venture; the business also being affected by the introduction of the railways and the motor vehicle. He was then considered one of the wealthiest men in New South Wales; the estate valued at £128,344 (equivalent to A$12.4M in 2020).

== Legacy ==
Cobb and Co. was a household word in the out-country in the second half of the nineteenth century. Scottish-Australian poet and balladeer Will H. Ogilvie (1869–1963) and Australian poet Henry Lawson among Australian writers both paid their tribute to "The Lights of Cobb and Co.", and certainly at this time Australia owed much to the untiring energy and management skills of James Rutherford.
