= Lithgow Blast Furnace =

Former blast furnace in New South Wales

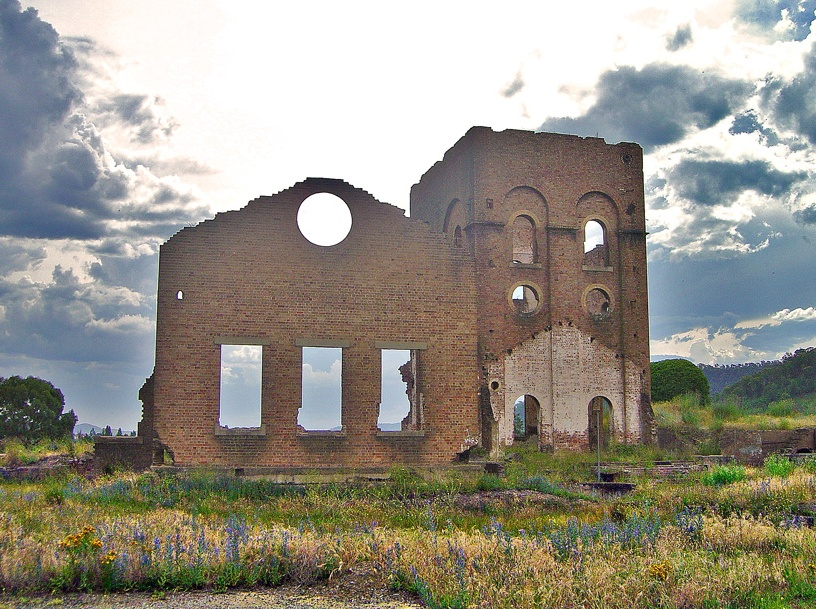
- The remains of the furnace, pictured in 2004.

- Location within New South Wales Location within Australia
- 33°28′30″S 150°10′13″E
- Location: Inch Street, Lithgow, City of Lithgow, New South Wales, Australia

History
- Built: 1906–1907

Site notes
- Owner: Lithgow City Council

New South Wales Heritage Register
- Official name: Lithgow Blast Furnace; Eskbank Ironworks Blast Furnace site; Industrial Archaeological Site
- Type: State heritage (archaeological-terrestrial)
- Designated: 2 April 1999
- Reference no.: 548
- Type: Furnace
- Category: Mining and Mineral Processing
- Builders: William Sandford Ltd.

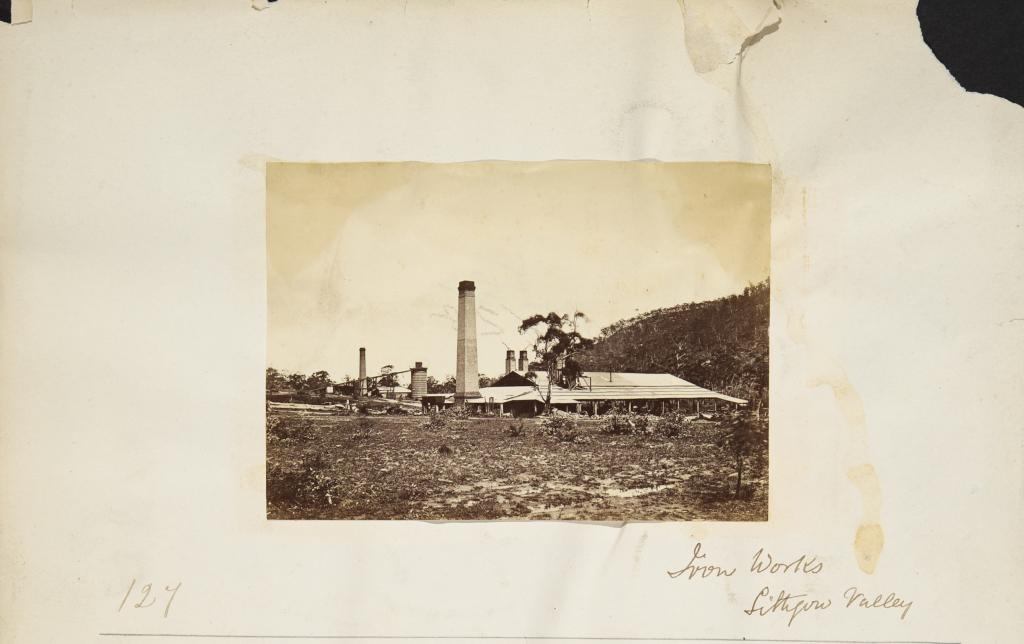
Eskbank Ironworks c.1875-1890. The original blast furnace (1875-1882) is the circular structure, in the background left of the tall chimney. The rolling mills are right of the chimney. The pair of chimneys to the right of the tall chimney are the puddling furnaces. (Powerhouse Museum Collection)

The Lithgow Blast Furnace is a heritage-listed former blast furnace and now park and visitor attraction at Inch Street, Lithgow, City of Lithgow, New South Wales, Australia. It was built from 1906 to 1907 by William Sandford Limited. It is also known as Eskbank Ironworks Blast Furnace site; Industrial Archaeological Site. The property is owned by Lithgow City Council. It was added to the New South Wales State Heritage Register on 2 April 1999.

== History ==
=== 1875 to 1900 ===
Lithgow's association with its iron and steel works was another of this city's big manufacturing eras. Its iron and steel works commenced in October 1875 when the first iron smelting took place. Ore had been discovered by Dan Williams on Eskbank land which was then owned by Enoch Hughes, who had previously worked at the Fitzroy Iron Works at Mittagong. The foundry was erected nearby after Hughes convinced James Rutherford, of Cobb & Co. fame, from Bathurst to become involved. The other principal shareholders were the NSW Minister for Public Works, the Hon. John Sutherland and Dan Williams, an engineer from Canada who worked on the Lithgow Zig Zag railway project. The Lithgow Valley Iron Works (later the Eskbank Ironworks) then consisted of a blast furnace, foundry and two bar rolling mills with the necessary fitting and smiths' shops. About 18,000 tonnes (20,000 short tons) of pig iron was made initially from local ores, which was converted into rails and bars. Work was carried on intermittently, until it was decided to pull down the blast furnace and convert the castings into merchant iron.

In May 1880 in the Lithgow Report it stated that the Eskbank Ironworks were working at the rate of four miles of rails per week. The new rails stood the test of 36 tonnes (40 short tons), the required standard being 27 tonnes (30 short tons). The blast furnace was in full swing and 91 tonnes (100 short tons) per week of iron was anticipated.

The original blast furnace at the Eskbank Ironworks closed in 1882, and it is reported that James Rutherford - to avoid the temptation to ever reopen it - in the dead of night, used two dray-loads of blasting powder to blow it up. After the blast furnace closed down, the rolling mills were used to re-roll old iron rails into merchant bars. In 1886, William Sandford, leased the rolling mills at the Eskbank Ironworks to roll rails. Sandford bought the ironworks in 1894.

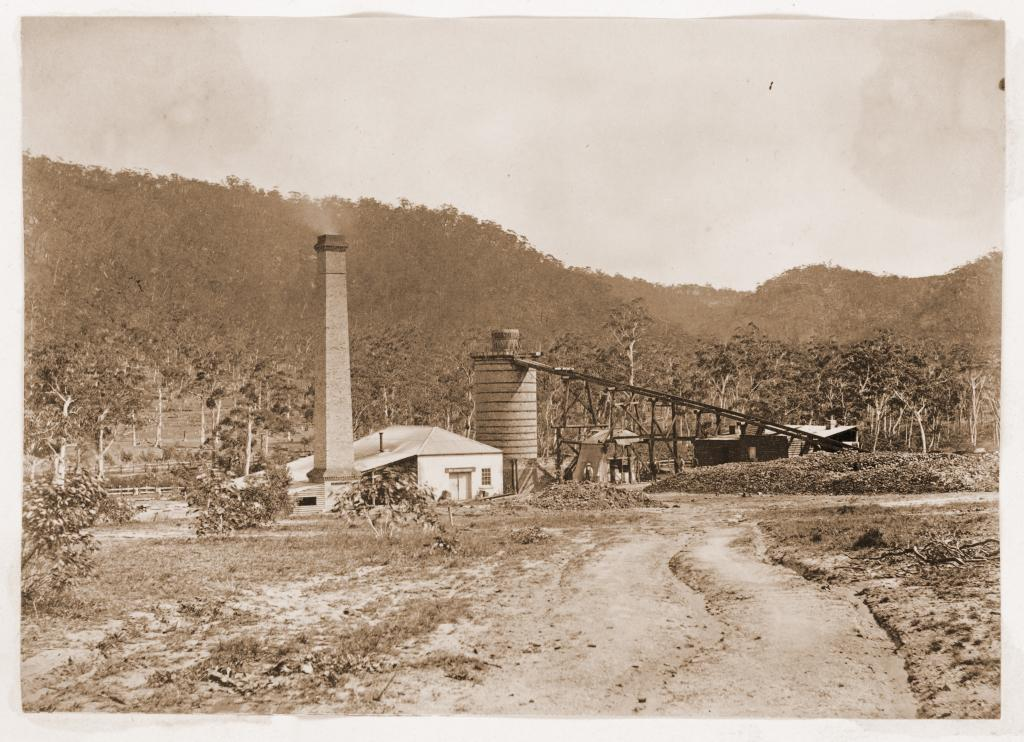
Original blast furnace (1875-1882) with its engine house on the left, taken in 1877. The inclined structure provided access to the furnace top for charging the furnace.

The Lithgow Blast Furnace was erected by William Sandford in 1906-1907, a short distance from the Eskbank Colliery which he had purchased outright in 1892. The construction of this later furnace over one kilometre (one mile) away from the Colliery was widely criticised, but its proximity to the railway and its size, providing scope for expansion, made it an understandable choice. It was constructed for the sole purpose of smelting iron from ore. It is a popular misconception that the site was also an ironworks. Indeed the Eskbank Colliery furnace, which operated between 1875 and 1882, is often confused with Sandford's later furnace.

After a layoff the mills at the Eskbank Ironworks were restarted on 30 July 1894. The old system had been discarded and the mills had now commenced on a partially co-operative principle, which it was expected would cheapen production and give better results generally. During the cessation of work the plant was added to and improved, in this way the sheet mill now starts equipped to produce nearly double its former product. An order for 91 tonnes (100 short tons) of spike iron, to be supplied at the rate of 9.1 tonnes (10 short tons) weekly, had been obtained from the Railway Commissioners. The company soon found themselves with an overdraft of about A£60,000 and had decided on closing the works when Sandford took them on lease in 1885. He added mill after mill, with powerful shears, furnaces, boilers and rollers, so that now the mills were fully equipped for the work they had to do. Output for all classes of finished iron and steel for the three years ending 31 December 1901 averaged over 6,400 tonnes (7,000 short tons) per annum. It did not cover more than a small percentage of what was imported into Sydney.

The works and sidings occupied a space of about 5 hectares (12 acres), situated between the Main Western Railway Line and Farmer's Creek, being connected with the main line at Eskbank Station, with sidings all round the works. Sand for the works was obtained from Farmer's Creek, close by, and loam for the foundry from a paddock adjoining the works. Within the ironworks' fence is a colliery adit, where the coal was drawn out by an engine, and the same skips drawn around the works, so that coal was only handled once, into the skips; and the same skips were tipped into the furnace bins in the ironworks. Coal was thus used fresh from the colliery, and bore comparison in heating qualities with most of the English coals. On the siding to the works was situated the steam sawmills, where timber of any ordinary size could be cut and delivered to the works.

To heat the iron for the mill, four large furnaces were used, each capable of heating from 4.5–5.4 tonnes (5–6 short tons) of iron per shift. Attached were large horizontal boilers for raising steam by the waste-head from the furnaces. There was a great deal of equipment on site including immense Cornish boilers, weighing 20 tonnes (22 short tons) for raising steam by the waste heat from the furnaces. There was a 1.4-tonne (1.5-short-ton) steam hammer, massive shears for cutting up rails into lengths, a large gantry, 91 centimetres (36 in) horizontal condensing 130-kilowatt (175 hp) engine and giant fly-wheels with 9 metres (30 ft) diameters, weighing 36 tonnes (40 short tons).

The No. 2 Sheet Mill had a 32-tonne (35-short-ton) flywheel. In the fitting shops were lathes, screwing, drilling and punching machines, nut and bolt machines, and a complete spike-making machine, where spikes for the Railway Construction Department had been made the previous three years. The foundry department had two large travelling cranes, a large and small cupola and an air furnace. There was also a large Siemens melting furnace, for dealing with scrap, scrap and pig iron. It was complete with a steam travelling crane capable of lifting 6.4-tonne (7-short-ton) cast iron moulds and large wrought iron ladles. Cement used in the works was mostly made at the Cullen Bullen Company's lime and cement works, about 16 kilometres (10 mi) from Lithgow There was another mill principally for rolling sheets for galvanising and corrugating sheets up to 4 metres (12 ft) long and 27 gauge.

=== Since 1901 ===
On 24 April 1901 Sandford organised a gala dinner to announce that he and his son Esk had successfully tapped the first viable quantities of steel produced in Australia at the Eskbank Ironworks. He had been working Eskbank since the 1880s, and although tapping steel was a triumph, he was nearly exhausted by it. Sandford felt iron and steel were basic commodities and needed to be boosted, and tried every which way to protect and support his venture. While Lithgow's coal miners were free traders, iron workers and their bosses were protectionists, so, to advance his cause, Sandford ran as a protectionist against Joseph Cook in the 1901 federal parliamentary election. He then tried to convince the NSW government to take over the works.

Finally, when a tender for steel and iron supply became available he bribed three parliamentarians, including William Holman, to win the contract. Part of that deal included the construction of a blast furnace, to enable production of pig iron for steel. Sandford complied.

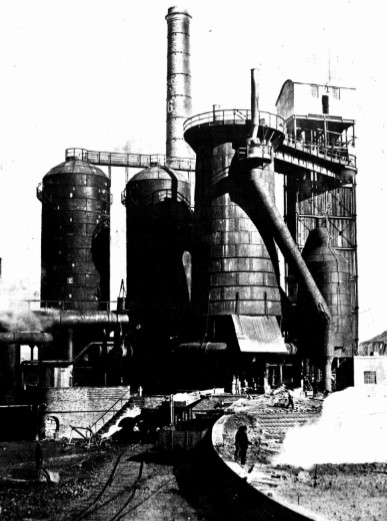
William Sandford Limited's new blast furnace in May 1907.

The Blast Furnace was "blown in" and officially opened by the premier of New South Wales, on 13 May 1907. It was Sandford's proudest moment and won him the title of the father of the Australian steel industry. His relations with workers were relatively harmonious and beneficent and the Eskbank estate was, to him, a satisfyingly noisy and smoky place. However behind the scenes, Sandford was financially and mentally strained. He could not raise capital but was unwilling to cede his management to external investors such as John Lysaght Ltd., and although Charles Hoskins and his brother George looked at the plant, they pulled out when they saw the state of the books.

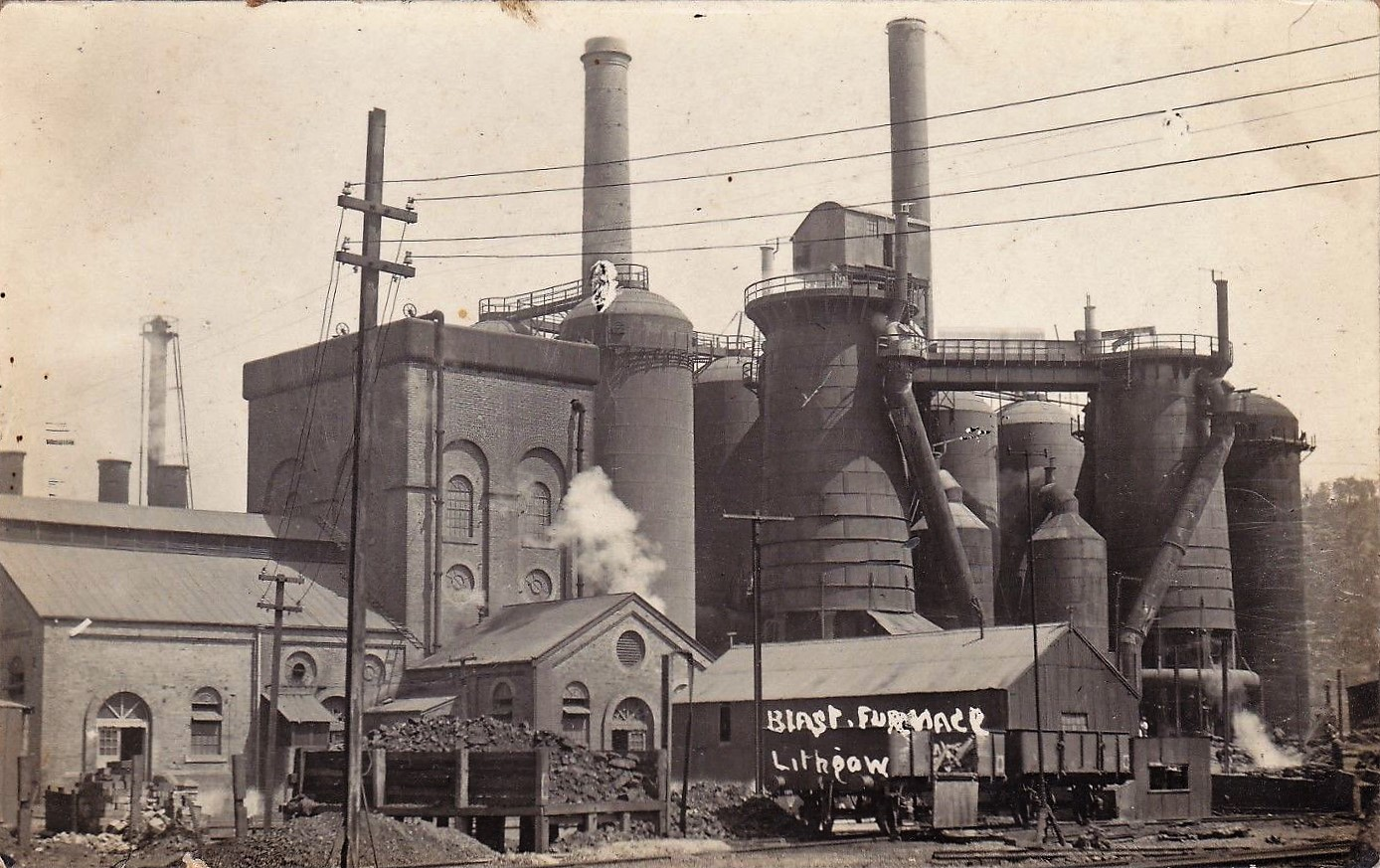
Blast Furnaces at Lithgow. Because there are two furnaces shown, this photograph was taken, between 1913 and 1928, during the period the Hoskins owned the plant.

The Commercial Banking Company of Sydney, which had underwritten the operation, foreclosed on the ironworks on 9 December 1907, although it kept the Blast Furnace running. William Sandford Limited could not fulfil its contract to supply the government with iron and steel. With 700 out of work, the Premier invited the Hoskins brothers to take over the Lithgow iron and steelworks. They took over Sandford's overdraft of £138,000, paying £14,000 to shareholders in the form of 4 per cent bonds and paying £50,000 to Sandford himself. Although the complicated deal ensured Sandford's debts were paid and he received enough money to guarantee his financial security, he was devastated and felt deceived by Charles Hoskins. His parting with the Lithgow community was sad for him, his wife Caroline, the workers and their community.

In 1908 the company was purchased by Hoskins Bros, owners of the premier manufacturer of iron pipes in Australia. They made few initial alterations to the Blast Furnace, although the ironworks underwent substantial changes. The Hoskins also succeeded in having Sandford's government contract transferred to themselves and extended until the end of 1916. Their success prompted them to build 80 coke ovens and a second blast furnace at the eastern end of the site in 1913. The second furnace was a near replica of Sandford's original construction, although slightly larger. Fifteen coke ovens were added shortly afterwards to cope with the extra fuel requirements.

The Hoskins were highly active in the development of the ironworking industry and staunchly opposed the growth of unionism. The Hoskins were clear-sighted about the technological problems of the steel and ironworks, and the labour issues, and had considerable business acumen, but Charles Hoskins was impatient and imperious and provoked industrial unrest as soon as he set foot in Lithgow in 1908. He was also a protectionist, and although his negotiations with government over tariffs were never entirely successful, he did manage to get the Eskbank enterprise onto a solid footing before the surge in production caused by World War I.

The outbreak of WWI saw considerable expansion in operations, although Lithgow's monopoly on iron smelting was about to be seriously challenged by BHP, who opened their Newcastle plant in 1915. However, the opening of a Small Arms factory in Lithgow ensured that the Hoskins' works flourished. A great deal of their profit was ploughed back into the expansion of capacity at the steelworks. In 1923 a fifth blowing engine was added to the original furnace. At 360 tonnes (400 short tons), it was the largest in Australia.

In the mid 1920s, the decision was taken to move operations to Port Kembla, where the natural resource and transport network were more attractive. The first parts of the Lithgow site were closed in 1928, although the last employees were dismissed in 1932.

The site was bought by the Lithgow City Council and was opened to the public as The Lithgow Blast Furnace Park in 1988.

== Description ==
The site is on the south-western edge of the former Coal Stage Hill, a natural ridge which has been much modified by the construction and operation of the furnace and plant. It is roughly wedge shaped, with its base line and southern boundary on the line of the Great Western railway line, which runs south-west north-east. The western boundary is formed by the back of Inch Street, while the northern boundary is an artificial line west-east.

The site is on three levels:

- The top level, 933 metres (3,061 ft) and above, houses the plant itself. This occupies a strip approximately 200 metres (660 ft) long and 100 metres (330 ft) wide.
- The middle level, at 929 metres (3,048 ft), is the area of the rail embankment and rail line to the former Steelworks site. It is connected to the top level on its eastern side by an almost imperceptible gradient.
- The bottom level is the area between the rear of Inch Street and the upper level. It forms the natural base of Coal Stage Hill. This area has slag dumps in it.

Archaeological remains of the three phases of occupation are as follows:

- Phase 1: walls of the Davey blower house; pump house foundations; footings for the first Parsons turbo-blower; the well outside the pumphouse; the floor of the boiler house; the brick revetment wall of the furnaces and stoves area; the foundations of No. 1 furnace and its four stoves; the base of the brick chimney stack; iron bottom-plates for three of the four stoves; the pig bins; the brick walls of the material bunkers; the pit for the truck drop.
- Phase 2: The brick revetment wall of the furnaces and stoves area; the foundations of No. 2 furnace and its four stoves; the brick base for the chimney stack; the footings for the second Parsons turbo-blower; the rail embankment in the south-west corner; the rail bridge over Inch Street; the bolts for the boiler stacks.
- Phase 3: footings for the third Parsons turbo-blower; footings for the Thompson engine; other extensions to the engine house; footings of the pig-breaking machinery; footings for its associated gantries.
- Has an Engineers Australia Historic Engineering Marker.
- Thompson blowing engine: An air blowing engine which produced 1,300 cubic metres (45,000 ft^{3}) of air per minute at 25psi. The engine weighed 400 tonnes and was installed in 1923.
- Parsons Turbines: Three air blowing engines each installed as the blast furnace increased in size. They varied in capability from 570 to 1,130 cubic metres (20,000 to 40,000 ft^{3}) per minute.
- Davy engine house: This building housed the Davy air blower which produced 420 cubic metres (15,000 ft^{3}) of air per minute. The blower was installed in 1906 and weighed 120 tonnes (130 short tons).
- Boiler house: This building housed ten Babcock and Wilcox boilers that were fired by waste gases from the blast furnaces.
- Material storage bins: This area has a capacity to store 50,000 tonnes (55,000 short tons) of iron ore, limestone and coke.
- Travelling crane walls: the electricity driven crane ran along these walls maintaining the raw material stockpiles.
- Blast Furnace No. 1: Built in 1907. It was 23 metres (75 ft) high and 5.8 metres (19 ft) in diameter.
- Blast Furnace No. 2: Built in 1913. It was almost identical to the No. 1 just slightly bigger dimensions.
- Cowper Stoves: These stoves which were filled with firebricks were used to pre-heat the air from the blowing engines before it went to the blast furnaces.
- Rail siding No. 2: Built in 1913 to service Blast Furnace No. 2 carrying molted slag to the dump and liquid iron to the steelworks.
- Pig Beds: The Pig Beds were sand cast moulds in which the molten iron that was tapped from the furnace was run into.
- Gantry supports: These gantry support blocks held the crane that lifted the pig iron combs over to the pig breaker. The gantry crane was erected in 1918.
- Rail siding No. 1: Constructed in 1907, but very much altered as the site expanded. After 1913 a ladle was shunted into here for taking molten iron to the steelworks.
- Water return channel: Returned the cooling water from the furnace to the cooling pond.
- Cooling pond: The cooling pond was constructed in 1907 and was used as a reservoir for water for use in the boilers and cooling the blast furnace sprays.
- Ferrant engine house: constructed in 1914 to house a steam electric power generating set.
- Air intake tunnel: construction in 1923 the air intake tunnel for the parsons turbine blowers and Thompson Blowing engine. It runs under the foundations and connects to each turbine house.

=== Condition ===
The archaeological potential is high.

=== Modifications and dates ===
Construction was in three phases:

- Phase 1: No. 1 blast furnace and plant built by William Sandford 1906-7.
  - artificial level for the furnaces cut (1906)
- Phase 2: Extensions made to the 1907 plant and construction of No. 2 blast furnace by G. and C. Hoskins Ltd., 1908-13.
  - the construction of rail sidings to connect the furnaces with coke ovens (1907 and 1910-1911).
  - the construction of the Hoskins coke ovens at the eastern end of the hill (1910-1912).
  - the excavation of the water reservoir, known as Lake Pillans (1911).
  - the construction of the railway line to the Hoskins' Steelworks (1911).
- Phase 3: Improvements to the plant by G. and C. Hoskins Ltd., 1914-1919 and Hoskins Iron and Steel, 1920-1925.

== Heritage listing ==
As at 8 April 2009, the layout of the Blast Furnace site represents the organic and uninterrupted growth of a workplace which is now the only relic of one of Australia's major industries. The Blast Furnace was the sole producer of iron in Australia for the first seven years of its life. The remains are in themselves a resource for studying technical changes in ironmaking.

Lithgow Blast Furnace was listed on the New South Wales State Heritage Register on 2 April 1999 having satisfied the following criteria.

- The place is important in demonstrating the course, or pattern, of cultural or natural history in New South Wales.

Built in 1906-7, the Blast Furnace was the sole producer of iron in Australia for the first seven years of its life. It remained a major producer for the next thirteen, until its closure in 1928. It reflects the growth of the Australian iron and steel industry and the confidence of the emerging nation. These industries were also of enormous importance to New South Wales and Lithgow in particular.

- The place is important in demonstrating aesthetic characteristics and/or a high degree of creative or technical achievement in New South Wales.

The Blast Furnace has aesthetic value in its superb siting clear of the town, its fine views and its functional architecture. It also has a romantic appeal and has been photographed often. The slag dumps which border the western part of the site powerfully evoke the elemental forces at work in the blast furnace.

- The place has strong or special association with a particular community or cultural group in New South Wales for social, cultural or spiritual reasons.

The men who built the furnace and worked there under difficult conditions, displayed endurance, solidarity, skill and pride in their work which deserves to be remembered. It is a symbol for the struggle for better conditions. There is still a "spirit of Lithgow" of which the site is a potent expression.

- The place has potential to yield information that will contribute to an understanding of the cultural or natural history of New South Wales.

The remains represent an organic growth and refinement of a major industrial plant and are in themselves a resource for studying technical change in ironmaking.

== Present Day ==
Today, the Blast Furnace is a common tourism destination. New upgrades have made The Blast Furnace and Lake Pillans accessible for all ages and abilities. You can walk through the remains of Engine Room 1 via walking platform. New colourful lights were introduced to the main buildings, lighting up the cities skyline. However, these lights have not been on since midway through 2025.

== See also ==
- Lithgow Zig Zag
- Fitzroy Iron Works - a C19th blast furnace at Mittagong N.S.W.
- Lal Lal Iron Mine and Smelting Works - a C19th blast furnace at Lal Lal, Victoria.
- List of 19th-century iron smelting operations in Australia
- William Sandford
- Charles Hoskins
- Cecil Hoskins
