= John Chambers (businessman) =

New Zealand businessman (1839–1903)

- Born: circa 1839; Bishop's Stortford, Hertfordshire, England
- Died: 27 September 1903; Parnell, Auckland, New Zealand
- Occupations: Businessman; Ironsands entrepreneur

John Chambers (c. 1839 – 27 September 1903) was a British citizen who became a New Zealand businessman and ironsands entrepreneur.

== Early life ==
He was born in Bishop's Stortford, Hertfordshire, England in about 1839 and arrived in New Zealand in 1866.

== Steel production in Onehunga ==
Chambers arrived in New Zealand in 1866 and realised that the iron sands on the beaches of Taranaki had iron production potential. The area takes its name from Mount Taranaki, a volcano that rises above the beaches. Chambers twice tried to further international interest in the resources of the sands but was thwarted at first by the lack of interest and smelting difficulties. He tried in 1876, when he approached smelters in the UK and US, but a general lack of interest produced only a few laboratory test smelts. In 1886 John Parry managed to persuade Sir Henry Bessemer to experiment with the sands; the results were promising, though Bessemer was in his twilight years and unable to continue with development.

Chambers attended the Philadelphia Exhibition of 1876, which proved unsuccessful; America had plentiful iron-ore resources that were cheap to smelt and so no interest was shown. Before leaving the US, Chambers heard about a smelting process invented by Joel Wilson of Dover, New Jersey, which proved promising. Chambers formed a company with Guy H. Gardner and bought the New Zealand rights to the patent. Wilson sent one of his men, W. H. Jones, to New Zealand to demonstrate the process and help manage the smelting once the furnace was built. This resulted in a furnace being built in the Onehunga suburb of Auckland, New Zealand. Work was completed in February 1883 at a cost of £500, with its first steel produced on 27 February of that year using sand from North Head of Manukau Heads under a sixty-year contract from the New Zealand government.

However, the company ceased trading after a series of events led to a gradual reduction in quality of the steel produced. Jones got drunk in Onehunga and argued with one of their bricklayers in December 1883. Jones shot and killed the man and was sentenced to 14 years hard labour. The company tried to carry on but Edmund Otway, Jones' successor, was taken ill and died in June 1884. His successor was an ironmaster from the Clyde region of Scotland, James McAndrew, who tried his best to carry on against mounting problems with the de-oxidation part of the process. Production from the iron sands was eventually discontinued, as no-one was able to produce the same quality of iron as Jones had managed, and the company resorted to producing wrought iron from scrap metal. This was a much-reduced profit margin and eventually the shareholders were left with debts of £20,000 and the works were broken up and shipped to China.

== Later life ==
Chambers continued in various other iron-related companies and other businesses around the Auckland region, including goldmining, eventually taking a position as manager of T. and S. Morrin & Son. Chambers started a company with his son in 1892, John Chambers and Son, importing mining equipment and other products; the company became a limited company in 1898.

Chambers died in 1903 in the Parnell suburb of Auckland.

== See also ==
- Onehunga Ironworks
