= Dannemora =

Dannemora is a Swedish place name, which was used for various places:

- Dannemora, Sweden, a village with 200 inhabitants, from which the others have got their name
  - Dannemora Minerals, a Swedish mining company located in the county of the above village
  - Dannemora mine, a famous historical iron ore mine near the above village
- Dannemora (village), New York
  - Dannemora Prison, colloquial name for the Clinton Correctional Facility in the above village
  - Escape at Dannemora, American TV series
- Dannemora (town), New York
- Dannemora, New Zealand, a residential suburb in Auckland
