= Lövstabruk =

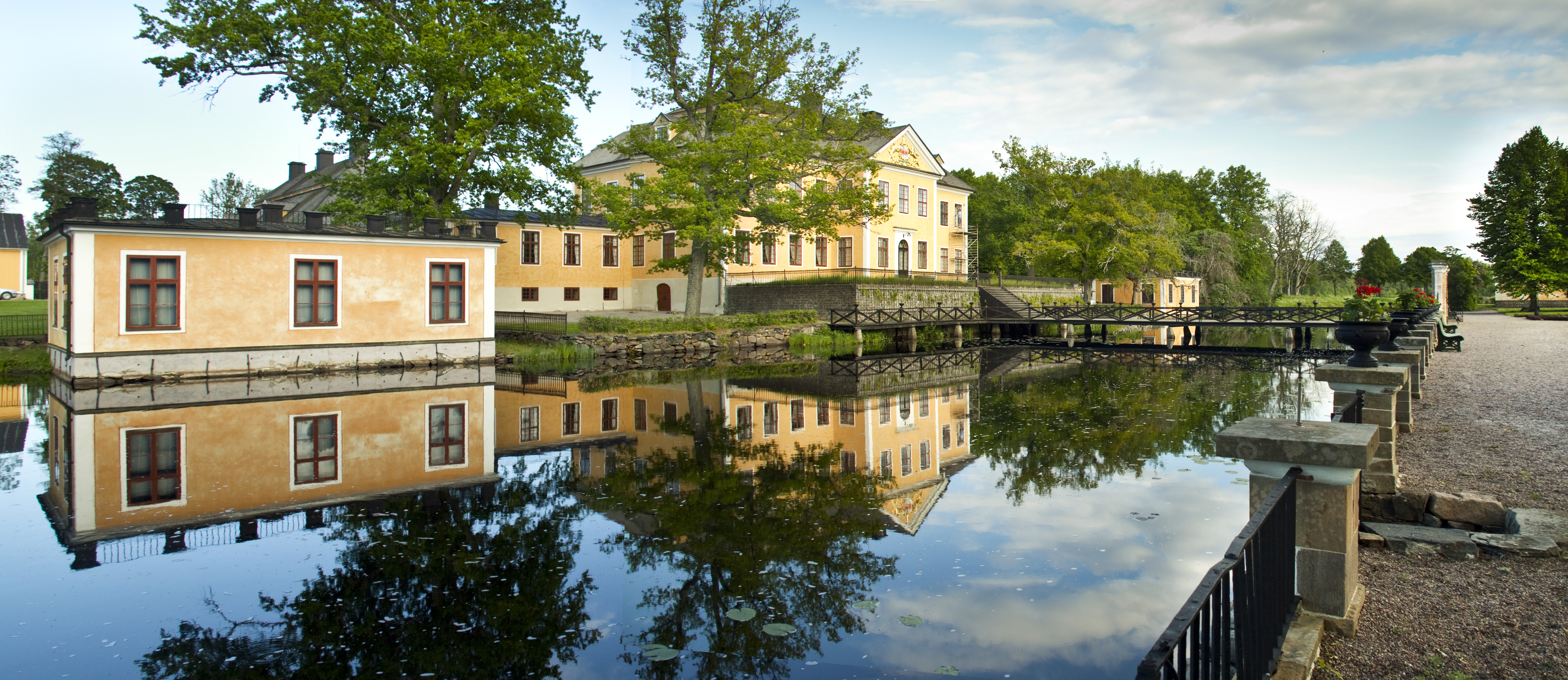

- Location within Uppsala Location within Sweden
- Coordinates: 60°24′N 17°53′E
- Country: Sweden
- Province: Uppland
- County: Uppsala County
- Municipality: Tierp Municipality

Area
  - Total: 0.20 km^{2} (0.077 sq mi)

Population (2010-12-31)
  - Total: 96
  - Density: 472/km^{2} (1,220/sq mi)
- Time zone: UTC+1 (CET)
  - Summer (DST): UTC+2 (CEST)

Lövstabruk is a village on a common in the parish of Österlövsta, Tierp Municipality, Uppsala County, Sweden. In 2010 it had a population of 96, compared to some 1300 at its height during the 18th century. The word lövsta is derived from lösta, an old Swedish word for "glade". The contemporary spelling in the 18th century was Leufsta, with French orthography reflecting the Walloon origin of the workforce. The latter part of the name, bruk, means both "mill town" and "ironworks".

== Ironworks ==
The settlement was founded as an ironworks by local farmers during the 16th century, from then on relying primarily upon the quality Dannemora ore. The ownership changed hands to the crown and back again. Another forgery was later built by the crown, which from time to time was leased to various tenants, most notably Wellam de Besche, governmental inspector over most ironworks in Sweden, in 1626 and to him and his partner Louis De Geer in the succeeding year. They introduced Walloon forging here, with at most five pairs of hearths (finery and cafery). In 1641 Louis de Geer, by then Swedish citizen, purchased Lövstabruk from the crown as part of a land sale to relieve the government's shortage of cash, and in 1668 his son Emanuel was able to negotiate a purchase of the other forge from the farmers. During his time, the facility was expanded considerably, and a park was created along the swamped sides of Risforsån, the creek from which power was supplied in four waterfalls, in total falling over 15 meters. Due to a shortage of charcoal, the blast furnaces were relocated to neighbouring villages, where various other expansion also took place. However, Lövstabruk remained the main production facility, and was the biggest ironworks in the country during a number of years in the 18th century. The iron produced at Leusta was of a kind known in England as oregrounds iron, after the port town of Öregrund. The brand mark used at Leufsta was an 'L' inscribed in an open circle, so that its products were known in England as "Hoop L iron". It was classified as first oregrounds and at the height of its power most of the products were exported to England, where it was converted to blister steel by the cementation process.

The ironworks was sold to Gimo-Österby AB in 1917, and the lion share of the woodlands to Korsnäs AB in 1935. Iron production ceased on 20 November 1926. All production facilities were torn down shortly after, while virtually all surrounding buildings remain intact. The manor and the land next to it was owned by the de Geer family for thirteen generations until 1986, when it was transformed into a foundation made up of the local county, Uppsala University, Tierp Municipality, and the de Geer family. Since 1997 most buildings are managed by National Property Board Sweden A number of apartments can be rented from Tierpsbyggen AB.

== The estate ==
Around 1615 the first timbered mansion was erected by the crown. 1702 the second wooden manor with six wings, possibly designed by Johan Hårleman, was finished during the ownership of Emmanuel's nephew Charles. In July 1719 Lövstabruk, along with most other locations of economic importance along the eastern coast of Uppland from Norrtälje to Harnäs bruk just south of Gävle, were burnt down by the northern half of a Russian fleet in an attempt by the Czar to move forward with the peace negotiations that were stalled by Sweden. This effort was ill responded to by the unenterprising Swedish government in the political vacuum after the death of King Charles XII. At first Charles de Geer was sceptical about rebuilding the ironworks in Lövstabruk, and considered giving up, going back to Wallonia. However, his able manager Georg Svebilius, who had successfully saved Skebo bruk by a civil militia of his during his employment there, persuaded him to go on. Within four years the ironworks was producing again, and in the 1730s the current Manor house, now built in stone with four wings, and other less important buildings were also reconstructed. The baron Charles de Geer was bestowed head of county in addition to many years of tax exemption for his efforts. Lövstabruk was made a fideicommiss during his ownership. When the childless bachelor died after a stroke in 1730, his nephew Charles de Geer inherited Lövstabruk at an age of 10. Charles studied entomology in the Netherlands, and was a reputed researcher in addition to running the ironworks from the age of 19. He knew Olof Rudbeck and Carl von Linne, and started a famous scientific library in Lövstabruk, including the 'Flower Book', now owned by Carolina Rediviva, as well as an Aviary. For those improvements to the manor, he hired Jean Eric Rehn, who also designed two new wings.

Charles de Geer's son, also named Charles, preserved the estate while the elder de Geer concentrated upon his interest in politics, agitating against the king. At the turn of the century the ironworks business went well, and the Manor was once more overhauled, this time by Isak Gustaf Clason. As the economy turned worse, a planned overall renovation of all buildings in a Dutch renaissance style never took place, except for the new warehouse and the bookkeeper's lodge.

The park was originally laid out in renaissance style, but later remodeled into barock style. After a period of decline it was yet again transformed during the end of the 19th century, this time with inspiration from Germany. During 1970–71 the park was restored inspired by its barock past as of 1769 under the lead of Walter Bauer, using drawings of Adolf-Fredrik Barnekow and Emanuel de Geer.

The church in Lövstabruk, built twice by the first Charles de Geer, houses a well-preserved organ by Niclas Cahman, constructed 1726–1728 with 28 ranks of pipes, where almost all of the visible pipes are used to make sounds.

The largest and most interesting Swedish collection of horse-drawn carriages still in private hands can be found in the stables.

On 1 March 1926 the narrow gauge railroad was officially opened. The service was discontinued in 1952, and the tracks were removed shortly after.

== Lövstabruk today ==
After the industrial and agricultural activities have been abandoned, the idyllic village of Lövstabruk today offers visitors a glimpse of its past, as well as culture of various sorts. Guided tours are regularly offered in Swedish, and, upon request, in English and German. Numerous artists and craftsmen are active in Lövstabruk today, primarily in the summer season. The archive is available for research.
