= Wrought iron =

Iron alloy with a very low carbon content

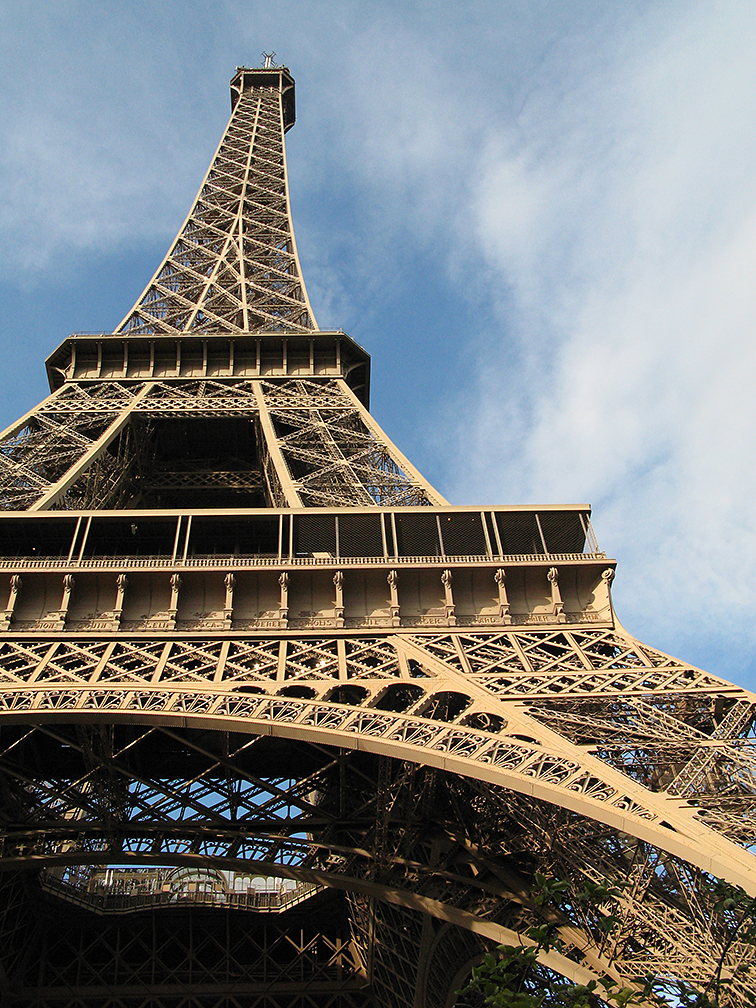
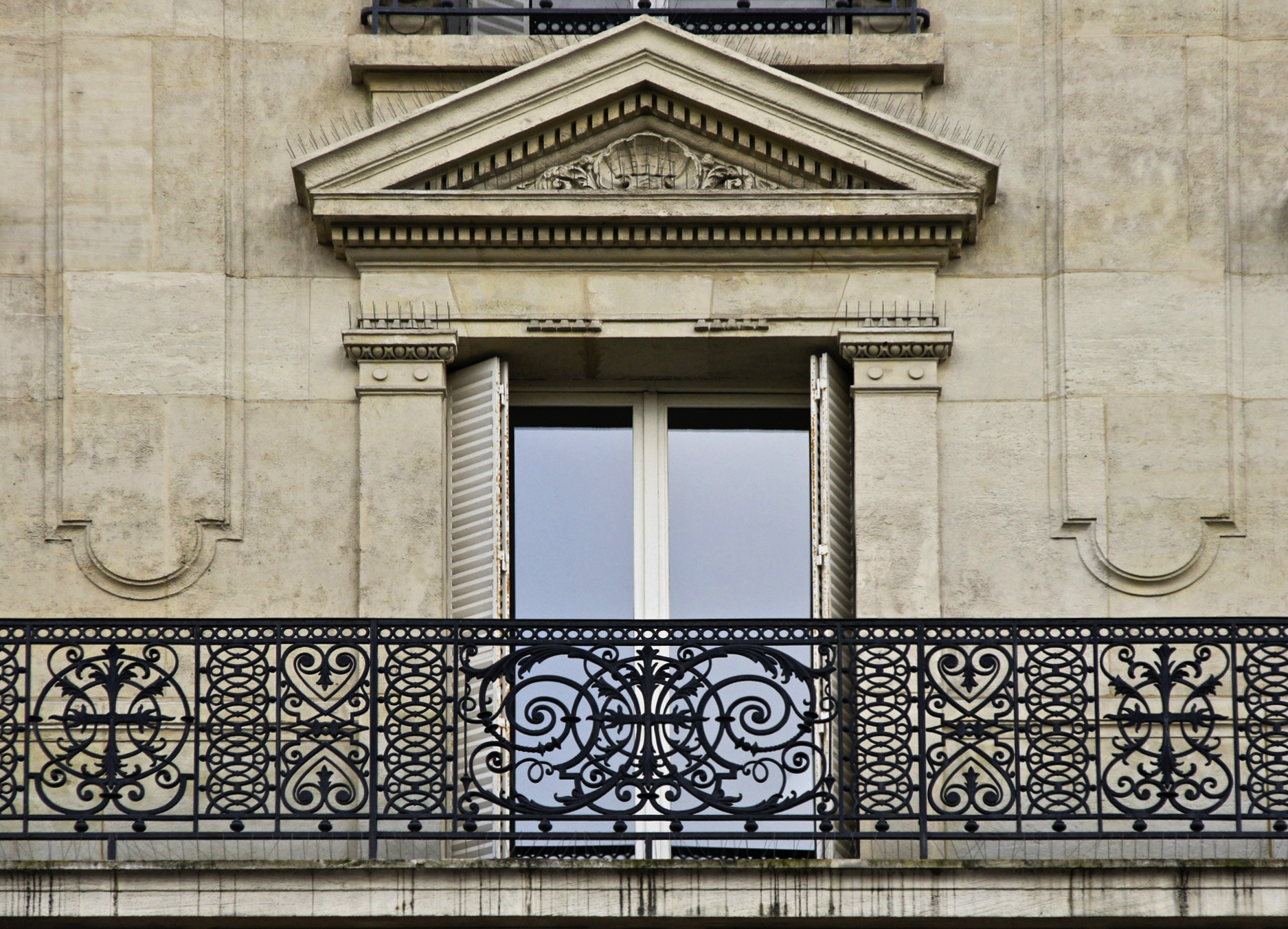
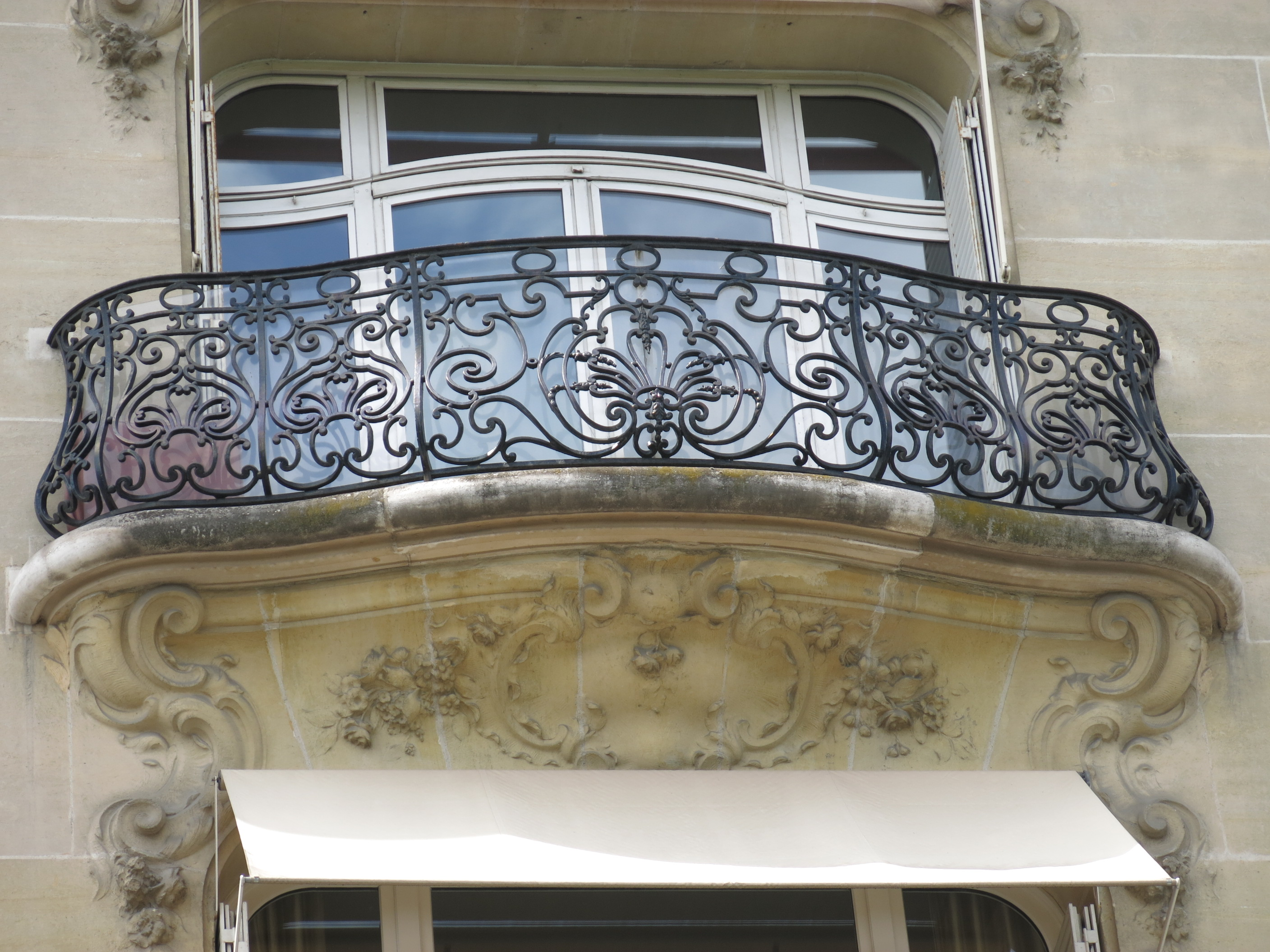
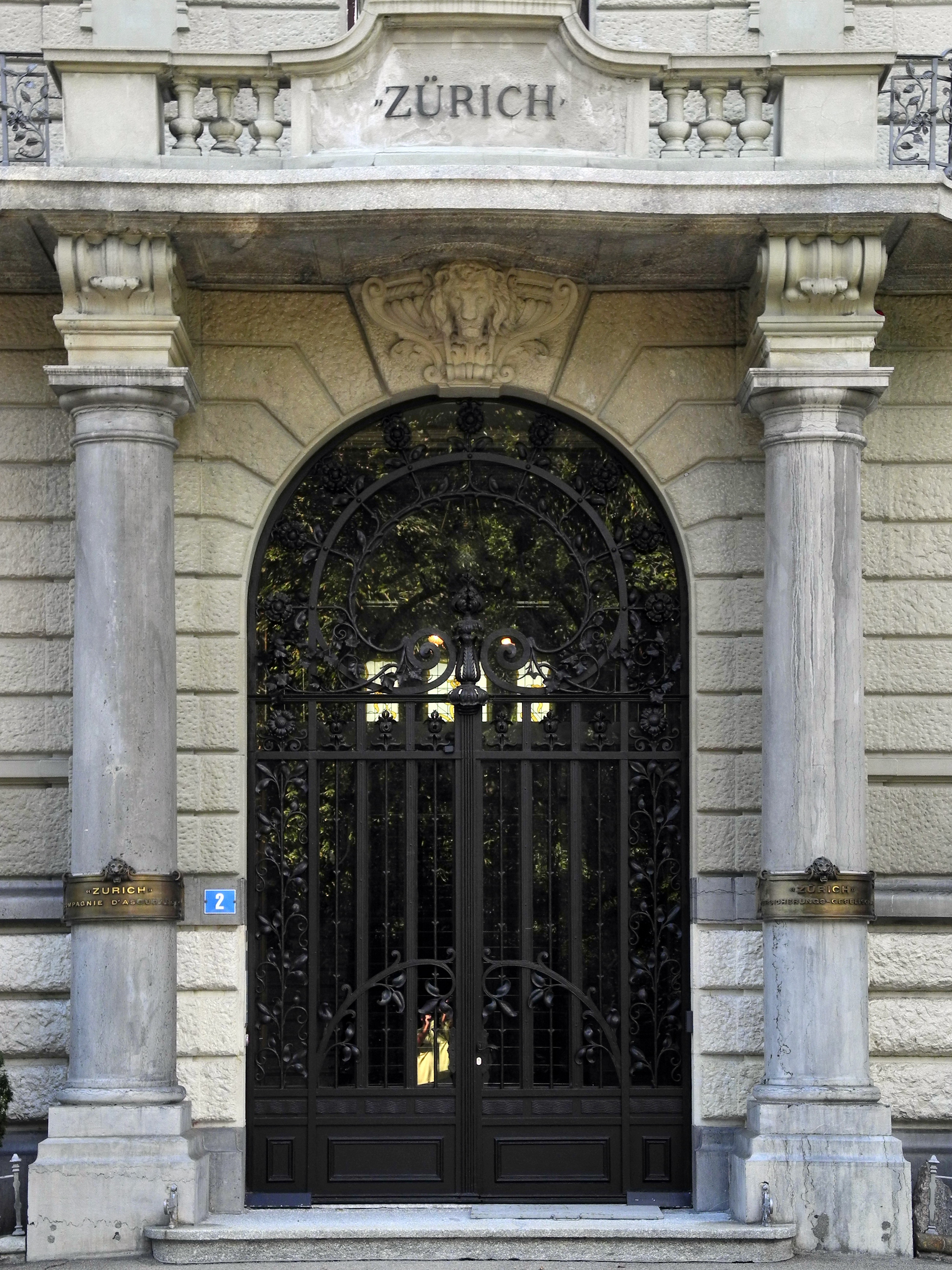
Various examples of wrought iron

Wrought iron is an iron alloy with a very low carbon content (less than 0.05%) in contrast to that of cast iron (2.1% to 4.5%), or 0.25% for low-carbon "mild" steel. Wrought iron is manufactured by heating and melting high-carbon cast iron in an open charcoal or coke hearth or furnace in a process known as puddling. The high temperatures cause the excess carbon to oxidise, the iron being stirred or puddled during the process in order to achieve this. As the carbon content reduces, the melting point of the iron increases, ultimately to a level which is higher than can be achieved by the hearth, hence the wrought iron is never fully molten and many impurities remain.

The primary advantage of wrought iron over cast iron is its malleability – where cast iron is too brittle to bend or shape without breaking, wrought iron is highly malleable, and much easier to bend.

Wrought iron is a semi-fused mass of iron with fibrous slag inclusions (up to 2% by weight), which give it a wood-like "grain" that is visible when it is etched, rusted, or bent to failure. Wrought iron is tough, malleable, ductile, corrosion resistant, and easily forge welded, but is more difficult to weld electrically.

Before the development of effective methods of steelmaking and the availability of large quantities of steel, wrought iron was the most common form of malleable iron. It was given the name wrought because it was hammered, rolled, or otherwise worked while hot enough to expel molten slag. The modern functional equivalent of wrought iron is mild steel, also called low-carbon steel. Neither wrought iron nor mild steel contain enough carbon to be hardened by heating and quenching.

The properties of wrought iron vary, depending upon the type of iron used and the variability inherent in the relatively crude and labour intensive manufacturing process. It is generally relatively pure iron with a very low carbon content plus a small amount of mostly silicate slag, which forms fibreous or laminar inclusions, caused by the hot rolling process used to form it into long bars or rods. Because these silicate inclusions separate layers of iron and form planes of weakness, wrought iron is anisotropic, its strength varying depending on its orientation. Wrought iron may typically be composed of around 99.4% iron by mass. The presence of slag can be beneficial for blacksmithing operations, such as forge welding, since the silicate inclusions act as a flux and give the material its unique, fibrous structure. The silicate filaments in the slag also protect the iron from corrosion and may diminish the effect of fatigue caused by shock and vibration.

Historically, a modest amount of wrought iron was refined into steel, which was used mainly to produce swords, cutlery, chisels, axes, and other edged tools, as well as springs and files. The demand for wrought iron reached its peak in the 1860s, being in high demand for ironclad warships and railway use. However, as advances in ferrous metallurgy improved the quality of mild steel, and as the Bessemer process and the Siemens–Martin process made steel much cheaper to produce, the use of wrought iron declined.

Many items, before they came to be made of mild steel, were produced from wrought iron, including rivets, nails, wire, chains, rails, railway couplings, water and steam pipes, nuts, bolts, horseshoes, handrails, wagon tires, straps for timber roof trusses, and ornamental ironwork, among many other things. (Note: Some but not all of these items are mentioned in Gordon, R. B. (1996))

Wrought iron is no longer produced on a commercial scale. Many products described as wrought iron, such as guard rails, garden furniture, and gates are made of mild steel. They are described as "wrought iron" only because they have been made to resemble objects which in the past were wrought (worked) by hand by a blacksmith (although many decorative iron objects, including fences and gates, were often cast rather than wrought).

== Terminology ==
The word "wrought" is an archaic past participle of the verb "to work", and so "wrought iron" literally means "worked iron". Wrought iron is a general term for the commodity, but is also used more specifically for finished iron goods, as manufactured by a blacksmith. It was used in that narrower sense in British Customs records, such manufactured iron was subject to a higher rate of duty than what might be called "unwrought" iron. Cast iron, unlike wrought iron, is brittle and cannot be worked either hot or cold.

In the 17th, 18th, and 19th centuries, wrought iron went by a wide variety of terms according to its form, origin, or quality.

While the bloomery process produced wrought iron directly from ore, cast iron or pig iron were the starting materials used in the finery forge and puddling furnace. Pig iron and cast iron have higher carbon content than wrought iron, but have a lower melting point than iron or steel. Cast and especially pig iron have excess slag which must be at least partially removed to produce quality wrought iron. At foundries it was common to blend scrap wrought iron with cast iron to improve the physical properties of castings.

For several years after the introduction of Bessemer and open hearth steel, there were different opinions as to what differentiated iron from steel; some believed it was the chemical composition and others that it was whether the iron heated sufficiently to melt and "fuse". Fusion eventually became generally accepted as relatively more important than composition below a given low carbon concentration. Another difference is that steel can be hardened by heat treating.

Historically, wrought iron was known as "commercially pure iron"; however, it no longer qualifies because current standards for commercially pure iron require a carbon content of less than 0.008 wt%.

=== Types and shapes ===
Bar iron is a generic term sometimes used to distinguish it from cast iron. It is the equivalent of an ingot of cast metal, in a convenient form for handling, storage, shipping and further working into a finished product.

The bars were the usual product of the finery forge, but not necessarily made by that process:

- Rod iron—cut from flat bar iron in a slitting mill provided the raw material for spikes and nails.
- Hoop iron—suitable for the hoops of barrels, made by passing rod iron through rolling dies.
- Plate iron—sheets suitable for use as boiler plate.
- Blackplate—sheets, perhaps thinner than plate iron, from the black rolling stage of tinplate production.
- Voyage iron—narrow flat bar iron, made or cut into bars of a particular weight, a commodity for sale in Africa for the Atlantic slave trade. The number of bars per ton gradually increased from 70 per ton in the 1660s to 75–80 per ton in 1685 and "near 92 to the ton" in 1731.

=== Origin ===
- Charcoal iron—until the end of the 18th century, wrought iron was smelted from ore using charcoal, by the bloomery process. Wrought iron was also produced from pig iron using a finery forge or in a Lancashire hearth. The resulting metal was highly variable, both in chemistry and slag content.
- Puddled iron—the puddling process was the first large-scale process to produce wrought iron. In the puddling process, pig iron is refined in a reverberatory furnace to prevent contamination of the iron from the sulfur in the coal or coke. The molten pig iron is manually stirred, exposing the iron to atmospheric oxygen, which decarburizes the iron. As the iron is stirred, globs of wrought iron are collected into balls by the stirring rod (rabble arm or rod) and those are periodically removed by the puddler. Puddling was patented in 1784 and became widely used after 1800. By 1876, annual production of puddled iron in the UK alone was over 4 million tons. Around that time, the open hearth furnace was able to produce steel of suitable quality for structural purposes, and wrought iron production went into decline.
- Oregrounds iron—a particularly pure grade of bar iron made ultimately from iron ore from the Dannemora mine in Sweden. Its most important use was as the raw material for the cementation process of steelmaking.
- Danks iron—originally iron imported to Great Britain from Gdańsk, but in the 18th century more probably the kind of iron (from eastern Sweden) that once came from Gdańsk.
- Forest iron—iron from the English Forest of Dean, where haematite ore enabled tough iron to be produced.
- Lukes iron—iron imported from Liège, whose Dutch name is "Luik".
- Ames iron or amys iron—another variety of iron imported to England from northern Europe. Its origin has been suggested to be Amiens, but it seems to have been imported from Flanders in the 15th century and Holland later, suggesting an origin in the Rhine valley. Its origins remain controversial.
- Botolf iron or Boutall iron—from Bytów (Polish Pomerania) or Bytom (Polish Silesia).
- Sable iron (or Old Sable)—iron bearing the mark (a sable) of the Demidov family of Russian ironmasters, one of the better brands of Russian iron.

=== Quality ===
Tough iron
Also spelled "tuf", is not brittle and is strong enough to be used for tools.
Blend iron
Made using a mixture of different types of pig iron.
Best iron
Iron put through several stages of piling and rolling to reach the stage regarded (in the 19th century) as the best quality.
Marked bar iron
Made by members of the Marked Bar Association and marked with the maker's brand mark as a sign of its quality.

=== Defects ===
Wrought iron is a form of commercial iron containing less than 0.10% of carbon, less than 0.25% of impurities total of sulfur, phosphorus, silicon and manganese, and less than 2% slag by weight.

Wrought iron is redshort or hot short if it contains sulfur in excess quantity. It has sufficient tenacity when cold, but cracks when bent or finished at a red heat. Hot short iron was considered unmarketable.

Cold short iron, also known as coldshear, colshire, contains excessive phosphorus. It is very brittle when cold and cracks if bent. It may, however, be worked at high temperature. Historically, coldshort iron was considered sufficient for nails.

Phosphorus is not necessarily detrimental to iron. Ancient Near Eastern smiths did not add lime to their furnaces. The absence of calcium oxide in the slag, and the deliberate use of wood with high phosphorus content during the smelting, induces a higher phosphorus content (typically <0.3%) than in modern iron (<0.02–0.03%). Analysis of the Iron Pillar of Delhi gives 0.11% in the iron. The included slag in wrought iron also imparts corrosion resistance.

Antique music wire, manufactured at a time when mass-produced carbon-steels were available, was found to have low carbon and high phosphorus; iron with high phosphorus content, normally causing brittleness when worked cold, was easily drawn into music wires. Although at the time phosphorus was not an easily identified component of iron, it was hypothesized that the type of iron had been rejected for conversion to steel but excelled when tested for drawing ability.

== History ==
=== China ===
During the Han dynasty (202 BC – 220 AD), new iron smelting processes led to the manufacture of new wrought iron implements for use in agriculture, such as the multi-tube seed drill and iron plough. In addition to accidental lumps of low-carbon wrought iron produced by excessive injected air in ancient Chinese cupola furnaces, the ancient Chinese created wrought iron by using the finery forge at least by the 2nd century BC, the earliest specimens of cast and pig iron fined into wrought iron and steel found at the early Han dynasty site at Tieshengguo. Pigott speculates that the finery forge existed in the previous Warring States period (403–221 BC), due to the fact that there are wrought iron items from China dating to that period and there is no documented evidence of the bloomery ever being used in China. The fining process involved liquifying cast iron in a fining hearth and removing carbon from the molten cast iron through oxidation. Wagner writes that in addition to the Han dynasty hearths believed to be fining hearths, there is also pictorial evidence of the fining hearth from a Shandong tomb mural dated 1st to 2nd century AD, as well as a hint of written evidence in the 4th century AD Daoist text Taiping Jing.

=== Western world ===
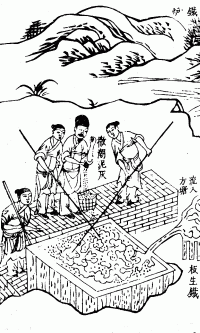
The puddling process of smelting iron ore to make wrought iron from pig iron, illustrated in the Tiangong Kaiwu encyclopedia by Song Yingxing, published in 1637.

Wrought iron has been used for many centuries, and is the "iron" that is referred to throughout Western history. The other form of iron, cast iron, was in use in China since ancient times but was not introduced into Western Europe until the 15th century; even then, due to its brittleness, it could be used for only a limited number of purposes. Throughout much of the Middle Ages, iron was produced by the direct reduction of ore in manually operated bloomeries, although water power had begun to be employed by 1104.

The raw material produced by all indirect processes is pig iron. It has a high carbon content and as a consequence, it is brittle and cannot be used to make hardware. The osmond process was the first of the indirect processes, developed by 1203, but bloomery production continued in many places. The process depended on the development of the blast furnace, of which medieval examples have been discovered at Lapphyttan, Sweden and in Germany.

The bloomery and osmond processes were gradually replaced from the 15th century by finery processes, of which there were two versions, the German and Walloon. They were in turn replaced from the late 18th century by puddling, with certain variants such as the Swedish Lancashire process. Those, too, are now obsolete, and wrought iron is no longer manufactured commercially.

=== Bloomery process ===
Wrought iron was originally produced by a variety of smelting processes, all described today as "bloomeries". Different forms of bloomery were used at different places and times. The bloomery was charged with charcoal and iron ore and then lit. Air was blown in through a tuyere to heat the bloomery to a temperature somewhat below the melting point of iron. In the course of the smelt, slag would melt and run out, and carbon monoxide from the charcoal would reduce the ore to iron, which formed a spongy mass (called a "bloom") containing iron and also molten silicate minerals (slag) from the ore. The iron remained in the solid state. If the bloomery were allowed to become hot enough to melt the iron, carbon would dissolve into it and form pig or cast iron. Because this was not the intention, however, the design of a bloomery made it difficult to reach the melting point of iron, and also prevented the concentration of carbon monoxide from becoming high.

After smelting was complete, the bloom was removed, and the process could then be started again. It was thus a batch process, rather than a continuous one such as a blast furnace. The bloom had to be forged mechanically to consolidate it and shape it into a bar, expelling slag in the process.

During the Middle Ages, water-power was applied to the process, probably initially for powering bellows, and only later to hammers for forging the blooms. However, while it is certain that water-power was used, the details remain uncertain. That was the culmination of the direct process of ironmaking. It survived in Spain and southern France as Catalan Forges to the mid 19th century, in Austria as the stuckofen to 1775, and near Garstang in England until about 1770; it was still in use with hot blast in New York in the 1880s. In Japan the last of the old tatara bloomeries used in production of traditional tamahagane steel, mainly used in swordmaking, was extinguished only in 1925, though in the late 20th century the production resumed on a low scale to supply the steel to the artisan swordmakers.

=== Osmond process ===
Osmond iron consisted of balls of wrought iron, produced by melting pig iron and catching the droplets on a staff, which was spun in front of a blast of air so as to expose as much of it as possible to the air and oxidise its carbon content. The resultant ball was often forged into bar iron in a hammer mill.

=== Finery process ===
In the 15th century, the blast furnace spread into what is now Belgium where it was improved. From there, it spread via the Pays de Bray on the boundary of Normandy and then to the Weald in England. With it, the finery forge spread. Those remelted the pig iron and (in effect) burnt out the carbon, producing a bloom, which was then forged into bar iron. If rod iron was required, a slitting mill was used.

The finery process existed in two slightly different forms. In Great Britain, France, and parts of Sweden, only the Walloon process was used. That employed two different hearths, a finery hearth for finishing the iron and a chafery hearth for reheating it in the course of drawing the bloom out into a bar. The finery always burnt charcoal, but the chafery could be fired with mineral coal, since its impurities would not harm the iron when it was in the solid state. On the other hand, the German process, used in Germany, Russia, and most of Sweden used a single hearth for all stages.

The introduction of coke for use in the blast furnace by Abraham Darby in 1709 (or perhaps others a little earlier) initially had little effect on wrought iron production. Only in the 1750s was coke pig iron used on any significant scale as the feedstock of finery forges. However, charcoal continued to be the fuel for the finery.

=== Potting and stamping ===
From the late 1750s, ironmasters began to develop processes for making bar iron without charcoal. There were a number of patented processes for that, which are referred to today as potting and stamping. The earliest were developed by John Wood of Wednesbury and his brother Charles Wood of Low Mill at Egremont, patented in 1763. Another was developed for the Coalbrookdale Company by the Cranage brothers. Another important one was that of John Wright and Joseph Jesson of West Bromwich.

=== Puddling process ===
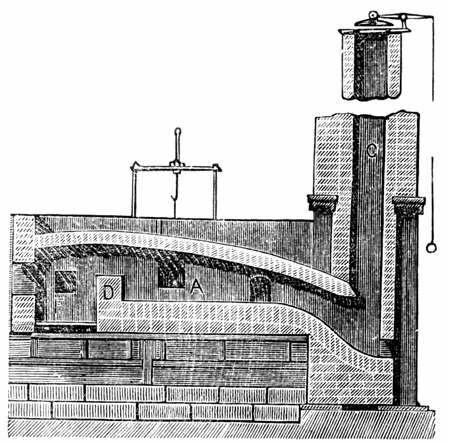
Schematic drawing of a puddling furnace

A number of processes for making wrought iron without charcoal were devised as the Industrial Revolution began during the latter half of the 18th century. The most successful of those was puddling, using a puddling furnace (a variety of the reverberatory furnace), which was invented by Henry Cort in 1784. It was later improved by others including Joseph Hall, who was the first to add iron oxide to the charge. In that type of furnace, the metal does not come into contact with the fuel, and so is not contaminated by its impurities. The heat of the combustion products passes over the surface of the puddle and the roof of the furnace reverberates (reflects) the heat onto the metal puddle on the fire bridge of the furnace.

Unless the raw material used is white cast iron, the pig iron or other raw product of the puddling first had to be refined into refined iron, or finers metal. That would be done in a refinery where raw coal was used to remove silicon and convert carbon within the raw material, found in the form of graphite, to a combination with iron called cementite.

In the fully developed process (of Hall), this metal was placed into the hearth of the puddling furnace where it was melted. The hearth was lined with oxidizing agents such as haematite and iron oxide. The mixture was subjected to a strong current of air and stirred with long bars, called puddling bars or rabbles, through working doors. The air, the stirring, and the "boiling" action of the metal helped the oxidizing agents to oxidize the impurities and carbon out of the pig iron. As the impurities oxidize, they formed a molten slag or drifted off as gas, while the remaining iron solidified into spongy wrought iron that floated to the top of the puddle and was fished out of the melt as puddle balls, using puddle bars.

==== Shingling ====
There was still some slag left in the puddle balls, so while they were still hot they would be shingled to remove the remaining slag and cinder. That was achieved by forging the balls under a hammer, or by squeezing the bloom in a machine. The material obtained at the end of shingling is known as bloom. The blooms are not useful in that form, so they were rolled into a final product.

Sometimes European ironworks would skip the shingling process completely and roll the puddle balls. The only drawback to that is that the edges of the rough bars were not as well compressed. When the rough bar was reheated, the edges might separate and be lost into the furnace.

==== Rolling ====
The bloom was passed through rollers and to produce bars. The bars of wrought iron were of poor quality, called muck bars or puddle bars. To improve their quality, the bars were cut up, piled and tied together by wires, a process known as faggoting or piling. They were then reheated to a welding state, forge welded, and rolled again into bars. The process could be repeated several times to produce wrought iron of desired quality. Wrought iron that has been rolled multiple times is called merchant bar or merchant iron.

=== Lancashire process ===
The advantage of puddling was that it used coal, not charcoal as fuel. However, that was of little advantage in Sweden, which lacked coal. Gustaf Ekman observed charcoal fineries at Ulverston, which were quite different from any in Sweden. After his return to Sweden in the 1830s, he experimented and developed a process similar to puddling but used firewood and charcoal, which was widely adopted in the Bergslagen in the following decades.

=== Aston process ===
In 1925, James Aston of the United States developed a process for manufacturing wrought iron quickly and economically. It involved taking molten steel from a Bessemer converter and pouring it into cooler liquid slag. The temperature of the steel is about 1500 °C and the liquid slag is maintained at approximately 1200 °C. The molten steel contains a large amount of dissolved gases so when the liquid steel hit the cooler surfaces of the liquid slag the gases were liberated. The molten steel then froze to yield a spongy mass having a temperature of about 1370 °C. The spongy mass would then be finished by being shingled and rolled as described under puddling (above). Three to four tons could be converted per batch with the method.

=== Decline ===
Steel began to replace iron for railroad rails as soon as the Bessemer process for its manufacture was adopted (1865 on). Iron remained dominant for structural applications until the 1880s, because of problems with brittle steel, caused by introduced nitrogen, high carbon, excess phosphorus, or excessive temperature during or too-rapid rolling. (Note: From Misa, T.J. (1995):"Quality problems with rails gave Bessemer steel such a bad reputation that engineers and architects refused to specify it for structural applications. Open hearth steel had a better reputation and displaced structural iron by 1889...") By 1890 steel had largely replaced iron for structural applications.

Sheet iron (Armco 99.97% pure iron) had good properties for use in appliances, being well-suited for enamelling and welding, and being rust-resistant.

In the 1960s, the price of steel production was dropping due to recycling, and even using the Aston process, wrought iron production was labor-intensive. It has been estimated that the production of wrought iron is approximately twice as expensive as that of low-carbon steel. In the United States, the last plant closed in 1969. The last in the world was the Atlas Forge of Thomas Walmsley and Sons in Bolton, Great Britain, which closed in 1973. Its 1860s-era equipment was moved to the Blists Hill site of Ironbridge Gorge Museum for preservation. Some wrought iron is still being produced for heritage restoration purposes, but only by recycling scrap.

== Properties ==
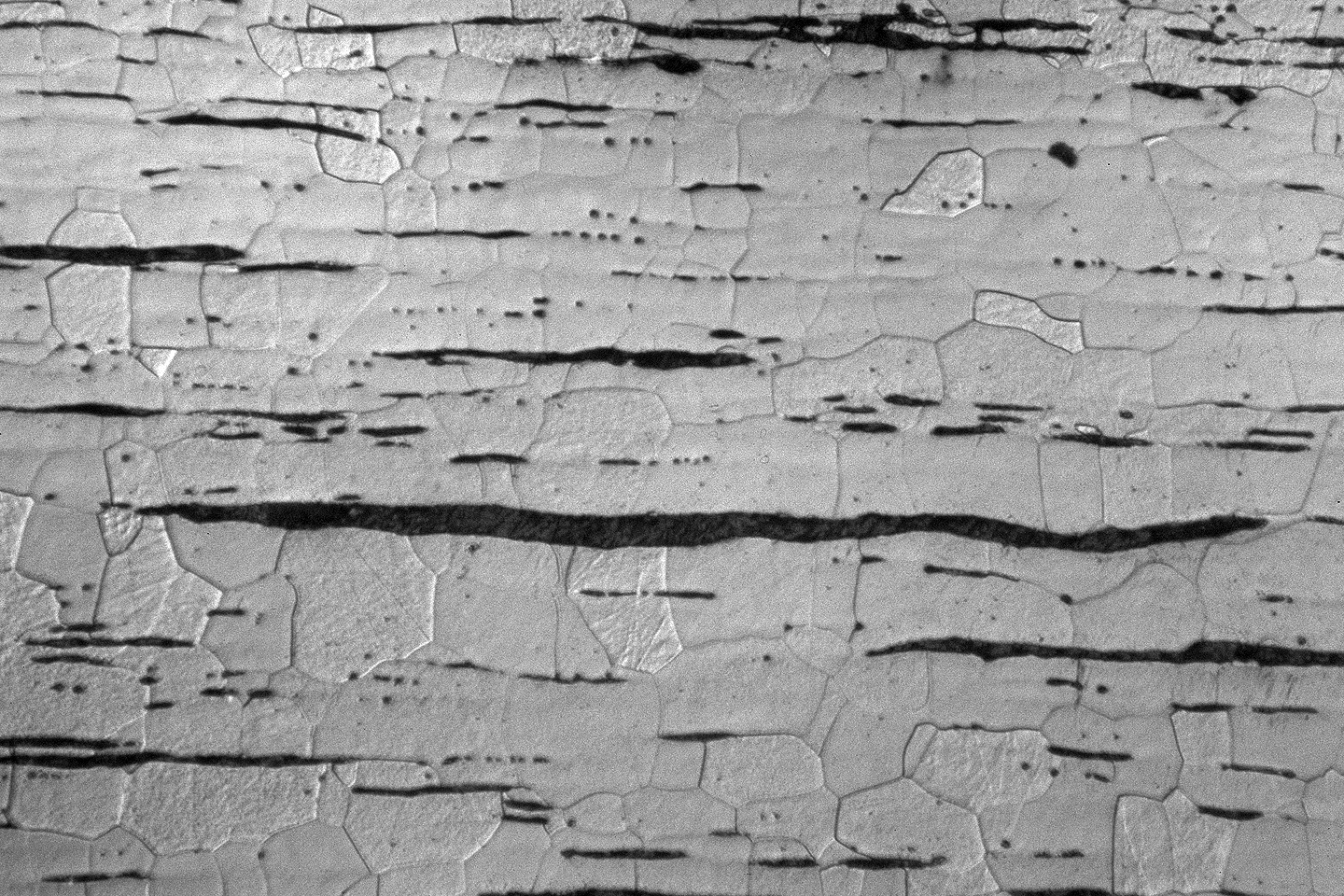
The microstructure of wrought iron, showing dark slag inclusions in ferrite

Wrought iron contains approximately 250,000 slag inclusions, or stringers, per square inch, giving it properties not found in other forms of ferrous metal. A fresh fracture shows a clear bluish color with a high silky luster and fibrous appearance.

Wrought iron lacks the carbon content necessary for hardening through heat treatment, but in areas where steel was uncommon or unknown, tools were sometimes cold-worked (hence cold iron) to harden them. An advantage of its low carbon content is its excellent weldability. Furthermore, sheet wrought iron cannot bend as much as steel sheet metal when cold worked. Wrought iron can be melted and cast; however, the product is no longer wrought iron, since the slag stringers characteristic of wrought iron disappear on melting, so the product resembles impure, cast, Bessemer steel. There is no engineering advantage to melting and casting wrought iron, as compared to using cast iron or steel, both of which are cheaper.

Due to the variations in iron ore origin and iron manufacture, wrought iron can be inferior or superior in corrosion resistance, compared to other iron alloys. There are many mechanisms behind its corrosion resistance. Chilton and Evans found that nickel enrichment bands reduce corrosion. They also found that in puddled, forged, and piled iron, the working-over of the metal spread out copper, nickel, and tin impurities that produce electrochemical conditions that slow down corrosion. The slag inclusions have been shown to disperse corrosion to an even film, enabling the iron to resist pitting. Another study has shown that slag inclusions are pathways to corrosion. Other studies show that sulfur in the wrought iron decreases corrosion resistance, while phosphorus increases corrosion resistance. Chloride ions also decrease wrought iron's corrosion resistance.

Wrought iron may be welded in the same manner as mild steel, but the presence of oxide or inclusions will give defective results. The material has a rough surface, so it can hold platings and coatings better than smooth steel. For instance, a galvanic zinc finish applied to wrought iron is approximately 25–40% thicker than the same finish on steel. In Table 1, the chemical composition of wrought iron is compared to that of pig iron and carbon steel. Although it appears that wrought iron and plain carbon steel have similar chemical compositions, that is deceptive. Most of the manganese, sulfur, phosphorus, and silicon in the wrought iron are incorporated into the slag fibers, making wrought iron purer than plain carbon steel.

Table 1: Chemical composition comparison of pig iron, plain carbon steel, and wrought iron
Material	Iron	Carbon	Manganese	Sulfur	Phosphorus	Silicon
Pig iron	91–94	3.5–4.5	0.5–2.5	0.018–0.1	0.03–0.1	0.25–3.5
Carbon steel	98.1–99.5	0.07–1.3	0.3–1.0	0.02–0.06	0.002–0.1	0.005–0.5
Wrought iron	99–99.8	0.05–0.25	0.01–0.1	0.02–0.1	0.05–0.2	0.02–0.2
All units are percent weight. Source:

Table 2: Properties of wrought iron
Property	Value
Ultimate tensile strength [psi (MPa)]	34,000–54,000 (234–372)
Ultimate compression strength [psi (MPa)]	34,000–54,000 (234–372)
Ultimate shear strength [psi (MPa)]	28,000–45,000 (193–310)
Yield point [psi (MPa)]	23,000–32,000 (159–221)
Modulus of elasticity (in tension) [psi (MPa)]	28,000,000 (193,100)
Melting point [°F (°C)]	2,800 (1,540)
Specific gravity	7.6–7.9
Specific gravity	7.5–7.8

Amongst its other properties, wrought iron becomes soft at red heat and can be easily forged and forge welded. It can be used to form temporary magnets, but it cannot be magnetized permanently, and is ductile, malleable, and tough.

=== Ductility ===
For most purposes, ductility rather than tensile strength is a more important measure of the quality of wrought iron. In tensile testing, the best irons are able to undergo considerable elongation before failure. Higher tensile wrought iron is brittle.

Because of the large number of boiler explosions on steamboats in the early 1800s, the U.S. Congress passed legislation in 1830 which approved funds for correcting the problem. The treasury awarded a $1500 contract to the Franklin Institute to conduct a study. As part of the study, Walter R. Johnson and Benjamin Reeves conducted strength tests on boiler iron using a tester they had built in 1832 based on a design by Lagerhjelm in Sweden. Because of misunderstandings about tensile strength and ductility, their work did little to reduce failures.

The importance of ductility was recognized by some very early in the development of tube boilers, evidenced by Thurston's comment:

If made of such good iron as the makers claimed to have put into them "which worked like lead," they would, as also claimed, when ruptured, open by tearing, and discharge their contents without producing the usual disastrous consequences of a boiler explosion.

Various 19th-century investigations of boiler explosions, especially those by insurance companies, found causes to be most commonly the result of operating boilers above the safe pressure range, either to get more power, or due to defective boiler pressure relief valves and difficulties of obtaining reliable indications of pressure and water levels. Poor fabrication was also a common problem. Also, the thickness of the iron in steam drums was low, by modern standards.

By the late 19th century, when metallurgists were able to better understand what properties and processes made good iron, iron in steam engines was being displaced by steel, whilst the old cylindrical boilers with fire tubes were displaced by inherently safer water tube boilers.

=== Purity ===
In 2010, Gerry McDonnell demonstrated in England by analysis that a wrought iron bloom, from a traditional smelt, could be worked into 99.7% pure iron with no evidence of carbon. It was found that the stringers common to other wrought irons were not present, thus making it very malleable for the smith to work hot and cold. A commercial source of pure iron is available and is used by smiths as an alternative to traditional wrought iron and other new generation ferrous metals.

== Applications ==
Wrought iron furniture has a long history, dating back to Roman times. There are 13th century wrought iron gates in Westminster Abbey in London, and wrought iron furniture seemed to reach its peak popularity in Britain in the 17th century, during the reign of William III and Mary II. However, cast iron and cheaper steel caused a gradual decline in wrought iron manufacture; the last wrought ironworks in Britain closed in 1974.

It is also used to make home decor items such as baker's racks, wine racks, pot racks, etageres, table bases, desks, gates, beds, candle holders, curtain rods, bars, and bar stools.

The vast majority of wrought iron available today is from reclaimed materials. Old bridges and anchor chains dredged from harbors are major sources. The greater corrosion resistance of wrought iron is due to the siliceous impurities (naturally occurring in iron ore), namely ferrous silicate.

Wrought iron has been used for decades as a generic term across the gate and fencing industry, even though mild steel is used for manufacturing these "wrought iron" gates. This is mainly because of the limited availability of true wrought iron. Steel can also be hot-dip galvanised to prevent corrosion, which cannot be done with wrought iron.

== See also ==
- Bronze and brass ornamental work
- Cast iron
- Semi-steel casting
