= Basil Brooke (metallurgist) =

English metallurgist and recusant

Sir Basil Brooke (1576 – 31 December 1646), English metallurgist and recusant, inherited the manor of Madeley, Shropshire from his father. This contained iron and steel works and coal mines. The coal mines had been worked in his father's time, coal being transported on the River Severn to cities and towns from Shrewsbury to Gloucester.

== Metallurgist ==
About 1615, he obtained an interest in a patent for making steel by the cementation process. This led to his building steel furnaces at Coalbrookdale, which certainly existed by the 1640s, and perhaps from 1615. The patent contained a clause prohibiting the import of steel, but he was unable to meet demand and was required to surrender his patent, although he evidently continued making steel, probably using iron from the Forest of Dean, though this was subsequently found not to be quite the best raw material.

In 1615, he and Richard Chaldecott of London took over two furnaces and a forge of the king's ironworks in the Forest of Dean, but in 1618, they were accused of illegal felling and their lease was suspended. The same accusation was made against the next farmers (i.e. lessees), but their lease was allowed to run its course. Brooke (with George Mynne and Thomas Hackett) leased all the king's works (four furnaces and three forges), but in 1633, new claims were made that the ironworks were having a disastrous effect on the Forest. By that stage they had built one or two more forges adjoining the Forest. Their lease was suspended, and at the following enquiry at the Forest Eyre, he and his partner were fined heavily, being deprived of their lease, and the works were let to others. The fine was subsequently abated somewhat. Every farmer of these works was accused of misfeasance; it is not clear that Brooke and his partners did anything wrong, or anything worse than any other farmer.

Sir Basil probably had ironworks at Coalbrookdale on his own Shropshire estate of Madeley. There was a 'smithy', that is a bloomery forge there when Wenlock Abbey was dissolved, but how long this continued in use remains unknown. However it is likely that there were (at least) forges there in his time. He certainly had ironworks somewhere in Shropshire in 1622, including Bromleys Forge near the mouth of the River Perry. He and his ironworks partners were also concerned in Shelsley Forge (in Shelsley Walsh).

Brooke, Mynne, and Hackett were also farmers of the Company of Mineral and Battery Works wireworks at Tintern, Monmouthshire, from (or by) 1627, Hackett having been farmer since 1613. Brooke remained a farmer until his sequestration during the Civil War.

== Catholic ==
Brooke was also one of the leading English Roman Catholics of his time, and was said to have personal contact with James I and Charles I. In 1635, he supported the Catholic clergy against Anglican episcopal oversight. He was treasurer for contributions collected from English Catholics towards the cost of the Bishops' Wars of 1639–40. In 1641, he was summoned by the House of Commons, but fled and was arrested at York and imprisoned in London.

== Brooke's Plot ==
Late in 1643, he was implicated in a plot to divide Parliament and the City of London authorities with a view to preventing the Scottish army taking part in the English Civil War. His correspondence was discovered and on 6 January 1644, he was imprisoned again. His estate was sequestrated in 1645 as a papist delinquent. He died on 31 December 1646, leaving debts of £10,000 and an estate worth £300 p.a. His wife was Etheldreda Brudenell, daughter of Sir Edmund Brudenell. His son Thomas later recovered his estate, which passed down the family for several generations.
