= Faggoting (metalworking) =

Technique to smelt and forge iron and steel

Faggoting or faggoting and folding is a metalworking technique used in the smelting and forging of wrought iron, blister steel, and other steel. Faggoting is a process in which rods or bars of iron and/or steel are gathered (like a bundle of sticks or "faggot") and forge welded together. The faggot would then be drawn out lengthwise. The bar might then be broken and the pieces made into a faggot again or folded over, and forge welded again.

Wrought iron which had been faggoted twice was referred to as "Best"; if faggoted again it would become "Best Best", then "Treble best", etc. Faggoting stretches chemical impurities within the metal into long thin inclusions, creating a grain within the metal. "Best" bars would have a tensile strength along the grain of about 23 short tons per square inch (46,000 psi, 317 MPa). "Treble best" could reach 28 short tons per square inch (56,000 psi, 386 MPa). The strengths across the grain would be about 15% lower. This grain makes wrought iron especially tricky to forge, as it behaves much like wood grain—prone to spontaneous splitting along the grain if worked too cold. Wrought iron, especially less refined iron, must be worked at or near a forge welding heat, that is incandescent and white in color. In old, very rusted pieces of wrought iron, the grain is revealed, making the iron bear a striking resemblance to reddish-brown wood, and if it is rusted into the grain too deeply, it will need to be refined once more before reforging it.

Blister steel that has been faggoted was known as shear steel; if faggoted twice, as double shear steel; and if faggoted three times, as triple shear steel. Steel that was intended to be treated this way was carburised, causing little bubbles on the surface of the material, hence the name "blister steel". It was then forge welded together to refine it and work the carbon throughout the material, instead of just on the surface.
