= Dannemora, Sweden =

Dannemora
- Location within Uppsala Location within Sweden
- Coordinates: 60°12′23″N 17°51′48″E
- Country: Sweden
- Province: Uppland
- County: Uppsala County
- Municipality: Östhammar Municipality

Area
  - Total: 0.66 km^{2} (0.25 sq mi)

Population (31 December 2020)
  - Total: 238
  - Density: 360/km^{2} (930/sq mi)
- Time zone: UTC+1 (CET)
  - Summer (DST): UTC+2 (CEST)

Dannemora is an old mining town and a locality situated in Östhammar Municipality, Uppsala County, Sweden. It had 213 inhabitants in 2010.

== Dannemora mine ==
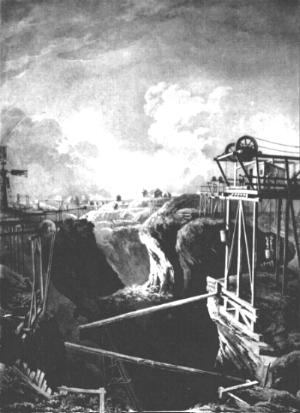
Dannemora mine around 1800

Dannemora is the location of an important iron ore mine, the Dannemora mine, which formed the basis of the iron industry in Uppland. It provided the raw material for about 20 finery forges that produced bar iron for export.

In the early mid-19th century, numerous workers from this town emigrated to the United States, with some settling in upstate New York at the site of other iron mines. They named the community Dannemora, after their former home.

In England, iron produced from Dannemora ore was known as oregrounds iron, after the port town of Öregrund, from which it was shipped. Bar iron from these forges was considered the best raw material for producing blister steel by the cementation process, owing mainly to the extremely low levels of sulphur and phosphorus in the ores, and their relatively high manganese content.

In 1878 the narrow gauge (891 mm) Dannemora–Hargs railway was opened to the port in Hargshamn. The iron ore was exported directly from this port.

The mine was closed down in 1992. With world market demand rising again, the feasibility of reopening the mine was investigated. The mine was re-opened in June 2012 in a ceremony performed by King Carl XVI Gustaf.

== See also ==
- Uppland
- Örbyhus
- Bergslagen
- Dannemora, New York
