= Dannemora mine =

Coordinates: 60°12′10″N 17°51′45″E

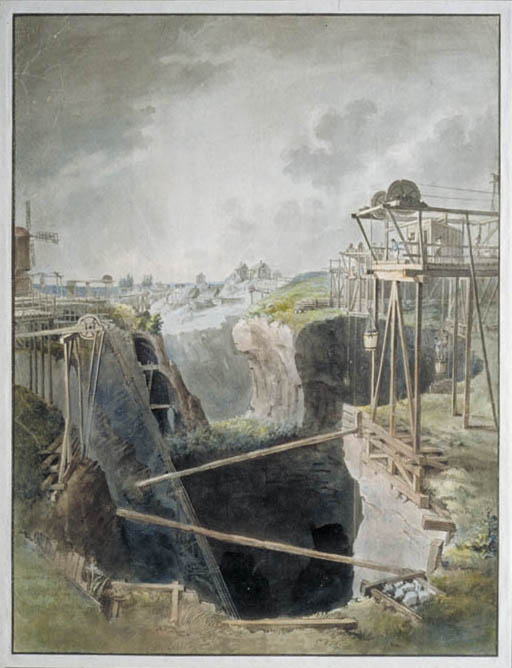
The open pit around 1780–1800. Pen drawing by Elias Martin

The Dannemora mine (Dannemora gruvor) at Dannemora in Uppsala County, Sweden was once one of the most important iron ore mines in Sweden. The mine was closed by its owners SSAB in 1992. It may have been open since the 13th century, but the first documentary reference was in 1481.

The mine has a depth of 640 metres and supplied oregrounds iron by the Walloon process (Vallonsmide) using a blast furnace and finery forge. Ironworks making sites included Österbybruk and Lövstabruk). Their products were particularly pure iron, due to the manganese content of the iron ore. This made it the best material for conversion to blister steel, the main variety of steel made in Great Britain between the 1610s and the 1850s.

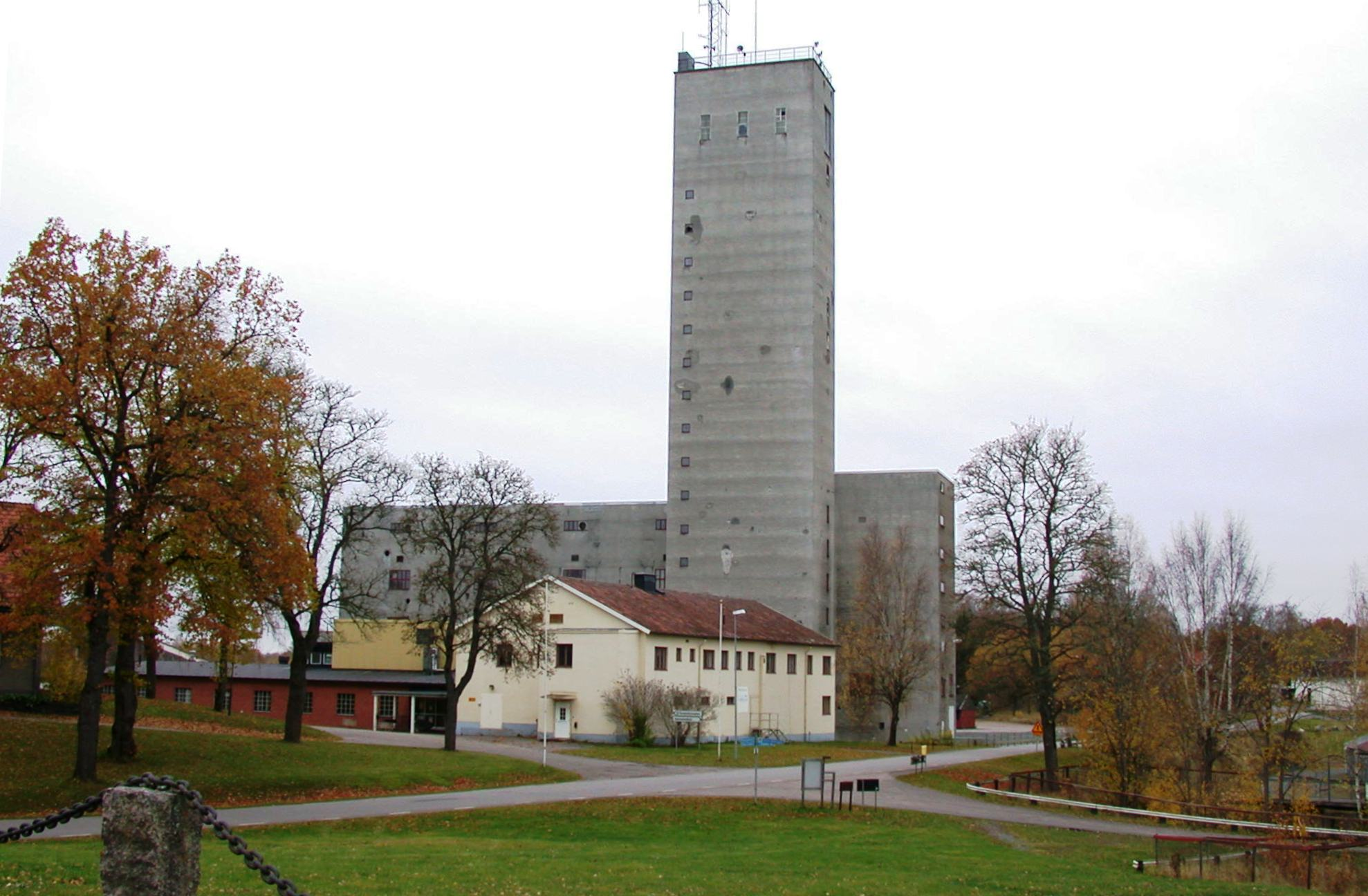
The new pithead gear at Dannemora, built in 1952

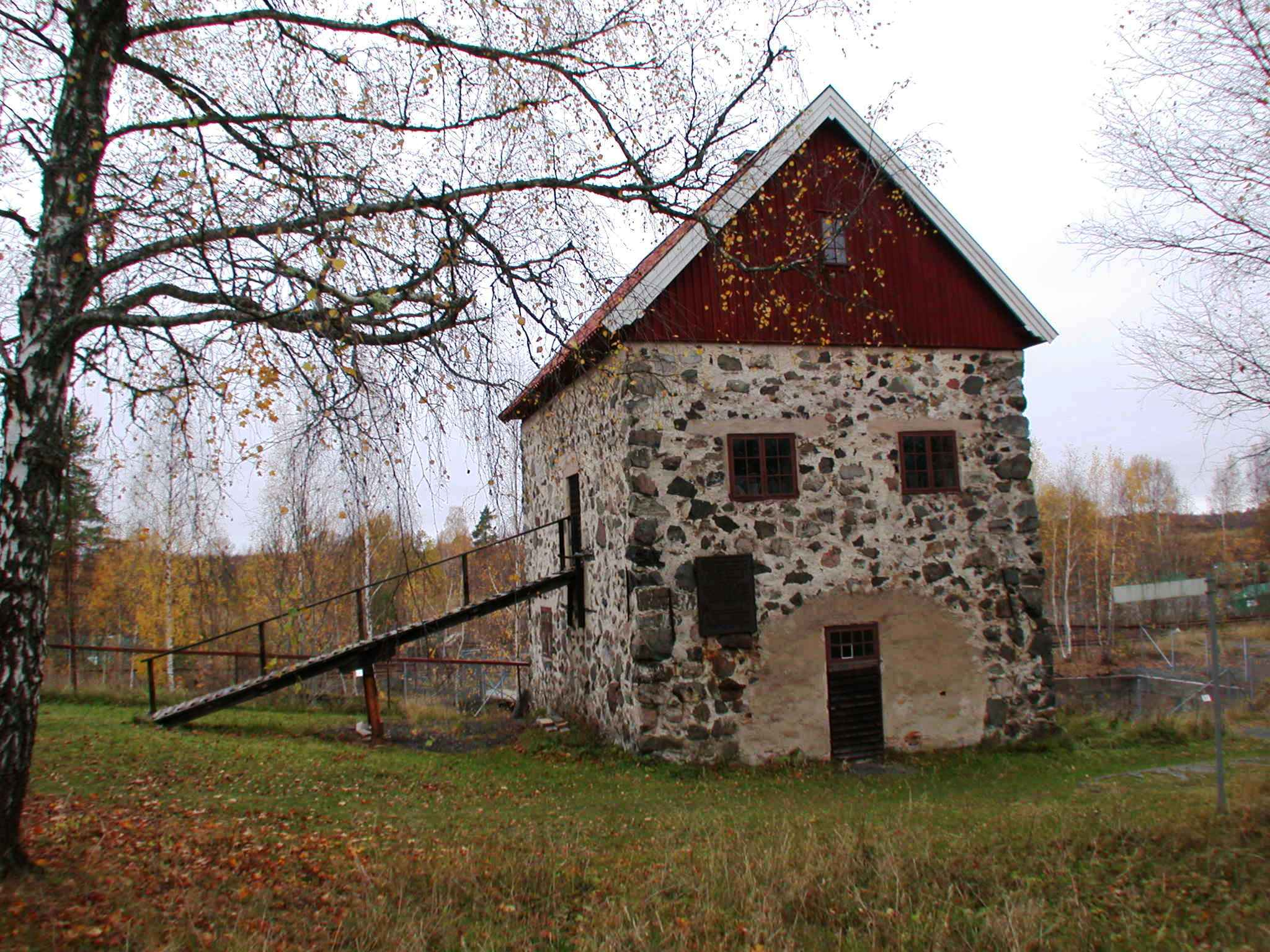
Mårten Triewald's engine house

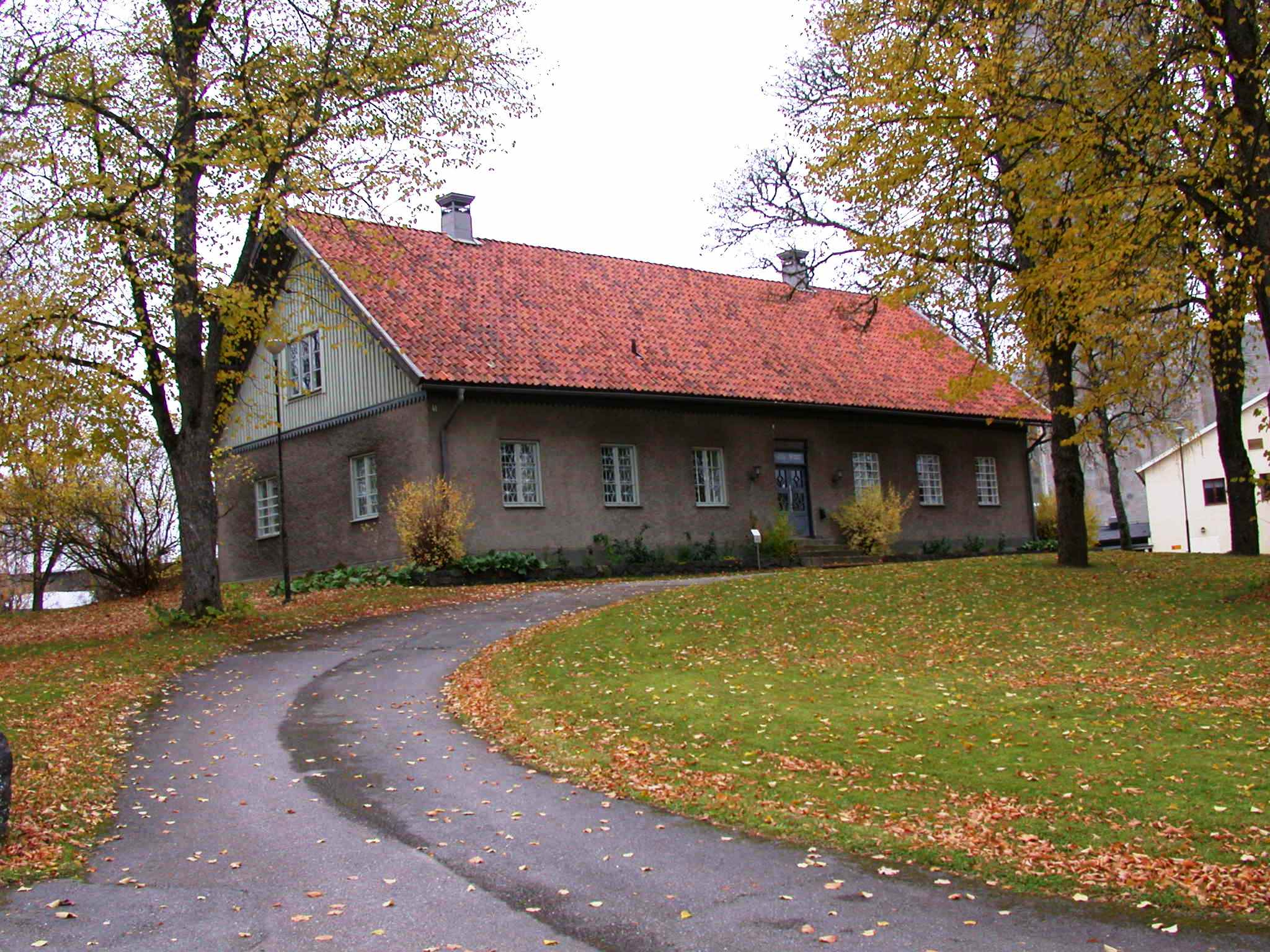
Site office at Dannemora mines

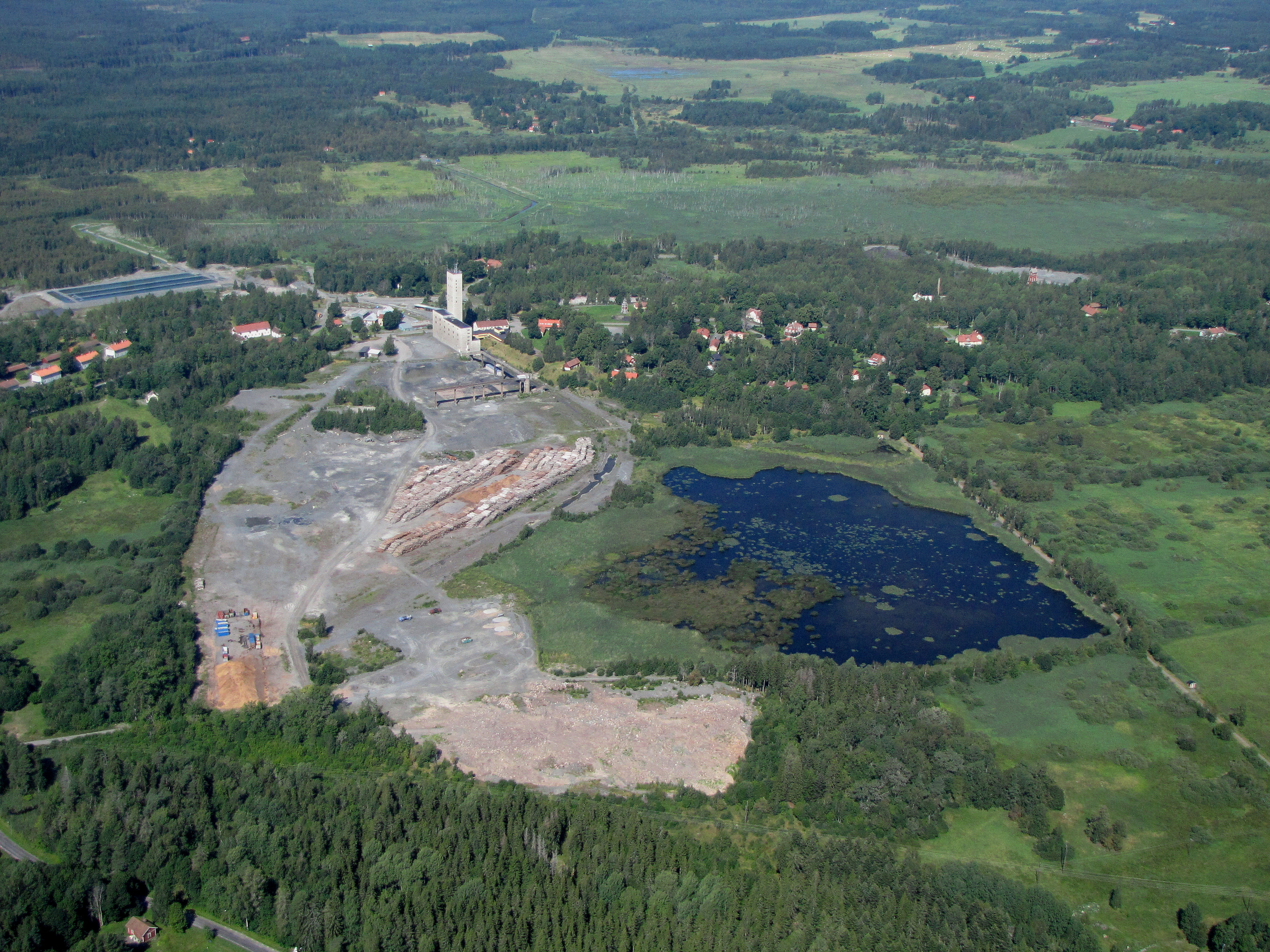
Dannemora mining area

== History ==
Joachim Piper renewed the mining privileges at Dannemora in 1532 and devoted substantial resources to the mine, mainly producing iron but also other minerals. the ownership structure changed in 1545, and a dozen wealthy individuals entered as the owners, so that a number of Germans and even King Gustav Vasa took part. The Germans were most interested in the export of pig iron but the king persuaded them to start production of wrought iron. It lasted only a few years and following a related bankruptcy, the king took over the operation fully.

Under 17th century, Dannemora iron had an uncontestedly high status among Swedish iron localities, especially in England where it was used in the steel raw material for tools, weapons, springs and other special purposes. A large part went to Sheffield, England. Thus Dannemora contributed to Sheffield's worldwide reputation as a steel city.

Around 1700 there were about sixty workers at Dannemora residents of the neighbourhoods around the mine. The number of workers who obtained their support from the mine is likely to be several hundred. In each mine large quantities of wood would be used, a method not abandoned until the 1730s. The reason for this was partly because gunpowder would be more expensive than wood, but also for danger's sake.

Throughout the mine's history, it had problems with water being situated by a lake. A pile-dam was built during the 17th century, and water- and wind-powered pumps were used. In 1728, at the initiative of Mårten Triewald (1691–1747), a steam-driven pump was installed, a Newcomen atmospheric engine, the first in Sweden, but it was never a success. The failure was probably due to the technology, which worked flawlessly in England, being new to Sweden and was run by inexperienced staff. During blasting to remove two waterfalls in the 1750s, water swept away a blast furnace, a mill and two sawmills. Despite a newly built dam, the mines were flooded in the spring flood of 1795 and it took until 1815 before the situation became normal. In 1805 a new steam engine of 10 horsepower was installed.

During the century 1770–1870, production was between 15,000 and 20,000 tonnes. In the 1870s, it rose to 40,000 tonnes and exports of pig iron from the Österby ironworks became significant. In order to facilitate shipments of ore Dannemora Hargs Railway (Dannemora–Hargs Järnväg) was built between Dannemora mines and Hargshamn in 1878. During the 20th century, production was 50,000 tonnes, but a strike in 1927 stopped operations entirely. Only in 1935 was it resumed. 1955 a new facility, with sorting plant and concentrator was finished and the annual production reached 600,000 tons. During the latter part of the 1970s, output decreased but still amounted to about one million tonnes of crude ore, of which the bulk was exported.

Shareholders of Dannemora mines had declined since the late 19th century through closures and mergers. In 1937 the four remaining owners (Fagersta Bruk, Iggesunds Bruk, Hargs Bruk and Stora Kopparbergs Berglag) formed AB Dannemora Mines. In 1974 Stora Kopparberg became the sole owner of the Dannemora mine. Only four years later, during the crisis that hit the Swedish steel industry in the late 1970s, however, the state-owned SSAB was forced to take over the mine.

== Current status ==
The current owner is Dannemora Mineral AB, which was listed May 25, 2007. The initial stock placement was heavily oversubscribed. In 2008, preparations began to resume mining of iron ore as well as other more precious metals. The mine was emptied of water and a new sorting mill and loading terminal was built. The railroad to the port at Hargshamn was refurbished. An opening ceremony featuring H M King Carl XVI Gustaf was held on 13 June 2012. The company went bankrupt in 2015 due to a decrease in iron price by 70 %.

The main access ramp is being extended down to the 350 m level, and a new ore elevator is being put in. The estimated ore reserves have been revised up to 35 million tonnes, sufficient for at least 14 years production.
