= Walloon forge =

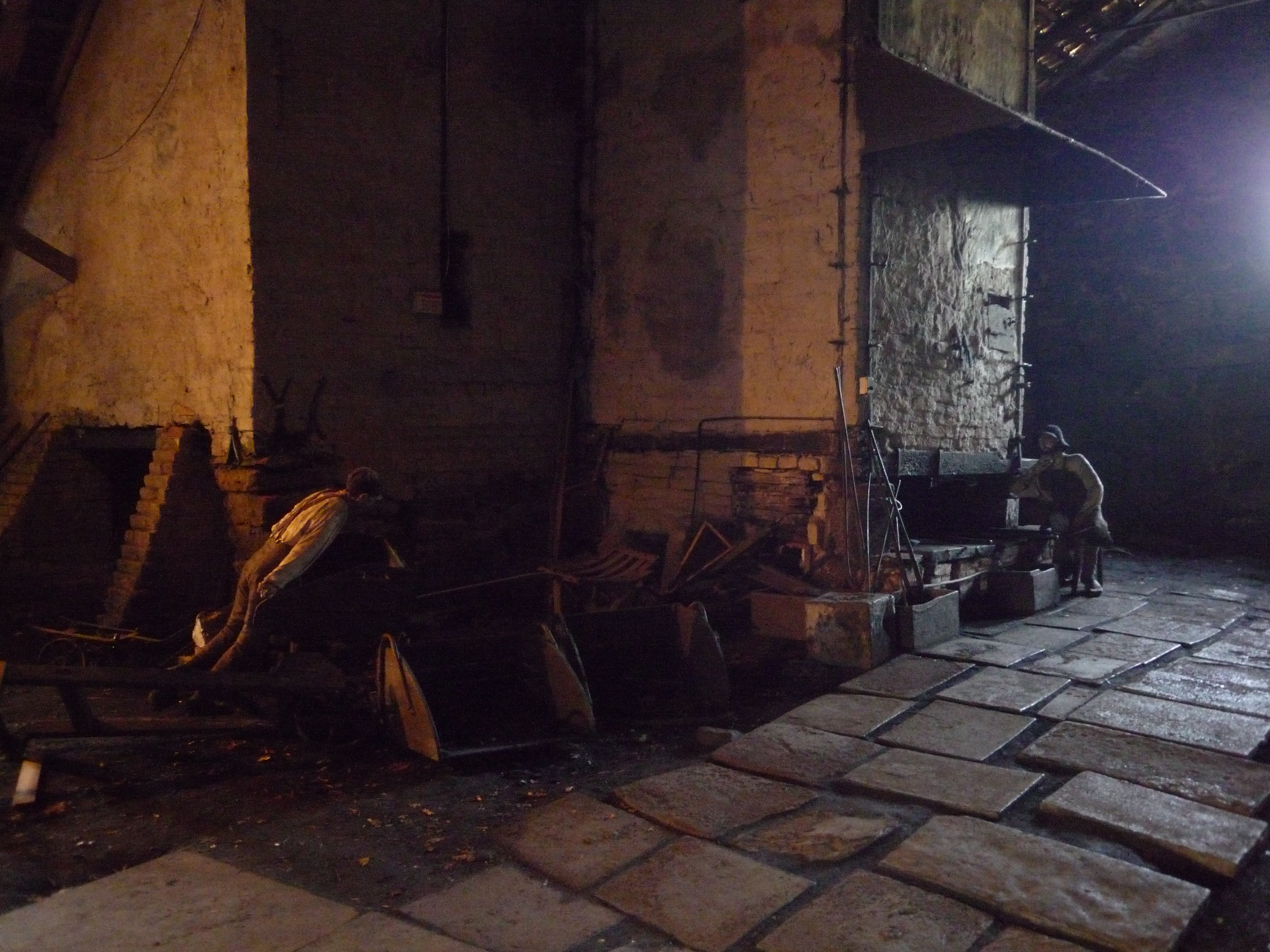
Inside a walloon forge at Österbybruk

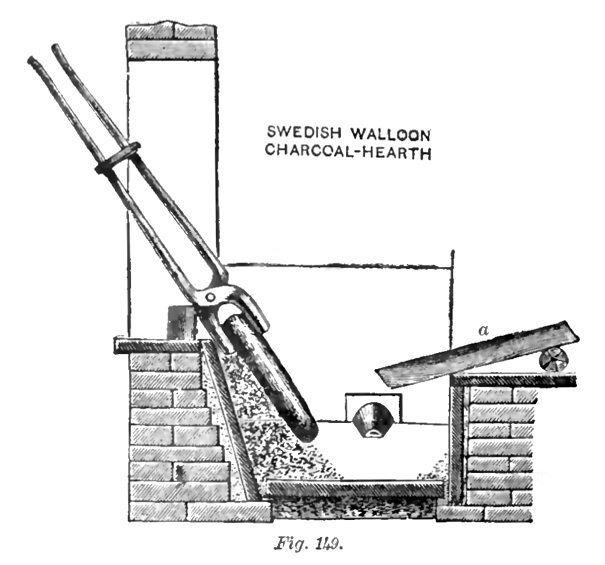
A schematic diagram of a Walloon hearth as used in Sweden

A Walloon forge (or Walloon process) is a type of finery forge that decarbonizes pig iron into wrought iron.

The process was conceived in the Liège region, and from there extended to France, then England around the end of the 15th century. Louis de Geer brought it to Roslagen in Sweden at the beginning of the 17th century, with Walloon blacksmiths.

The Walloon process spread to Sweden in the Uppland province north of Stockholm, where it was used to produce a specific kind of wrought iron called oregrounds iron.

== In Sweden ==
The source material was pig iron produced by a blast furnace using charcoal and the manganese rich iron ore from the Dannemora mine. A V-shaped hearth using charcoal was used to heat up the pig iron bar that was presented to a tuyere that decarbonized it and made it melt and fall in drops that solidified in a pool of slag where the decarburization continued. The iron drops were picked up with an iron bar and presented again in front of the tuyere and one by one agglomerated into a ball. That heterogeneous iron was full of slag and the carbon content ranged from pure iron to nearly pig iron. It was therefore reheated in a chafery and hammered and folded using a waterwheel powered trip hammer.

The ore from Dannemora was very low in sulphur and high in manganese. It is possible the manganese bonded with the impurities during the oxidation, creating a pretty pure wrought iron. The use of charcoal prevented the contamination with impurities usually associated with the usage of coal or coke, of which Sweden has very little (although coal was mined in Höganäs, Scania County from 1797). In England, the chafery might use coal or coke, as in this stage the iron is solidified and the contamination remain low.

The iron was sold to England, where it was recarbonized into blister steel using the cementation process. This steel still contained some slag, and if the carbon was around 1% at the surface, it was lower in the center. The blister steel was than purchased by Benjamin Huntsman who melted it in crucibles heated in coke-fired ovens and poured it. This modern crucible steel was different from the medieval wootz from India, but was homogeneous and without slag.
