= Derwentcote Steel Furnace =

Cementation furnace near Newcastle, England

Coordinates: 54°54′11″N 1°47′53″W

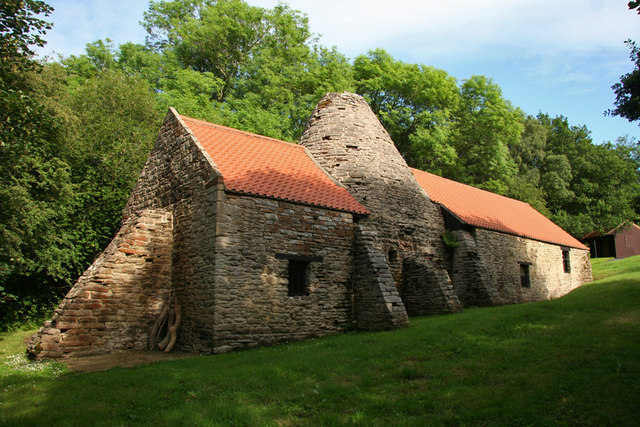
Derwentcote Steel Furnace

Derwentcote Steel Furnace (grid reference NZ131566), Rowlands Gill, near Newcastle upon Tyne, England, built in 1720, is an example of an early cementation furnace which produced high-grade steel. A Grade I listed building, it is part of an industrial and mining site that has been protected as a scheduled monument.

It was restored in 1990 by English Heritage.
