= Chafery =

Variety of hearth used in ironmaking

A chafery is a variety of hearth used in ironmaking for reheating a bloom of iron, in the course of its being drawn out into a bar of wrought iron.

The equivalent term for a bloomery was string hearth, except in 17th century Cumbria, where the terminology was that of the finery forge.

A finery forge for the Walloon process would typically have one chafery to work two fineries (but sometimes one or three fineries).

Chaferies were also used in the potting and stamping forges of the Industrial Revolution.
