= Tuyere =

Tube, nozzle or pipe through which air is blown into a furnace

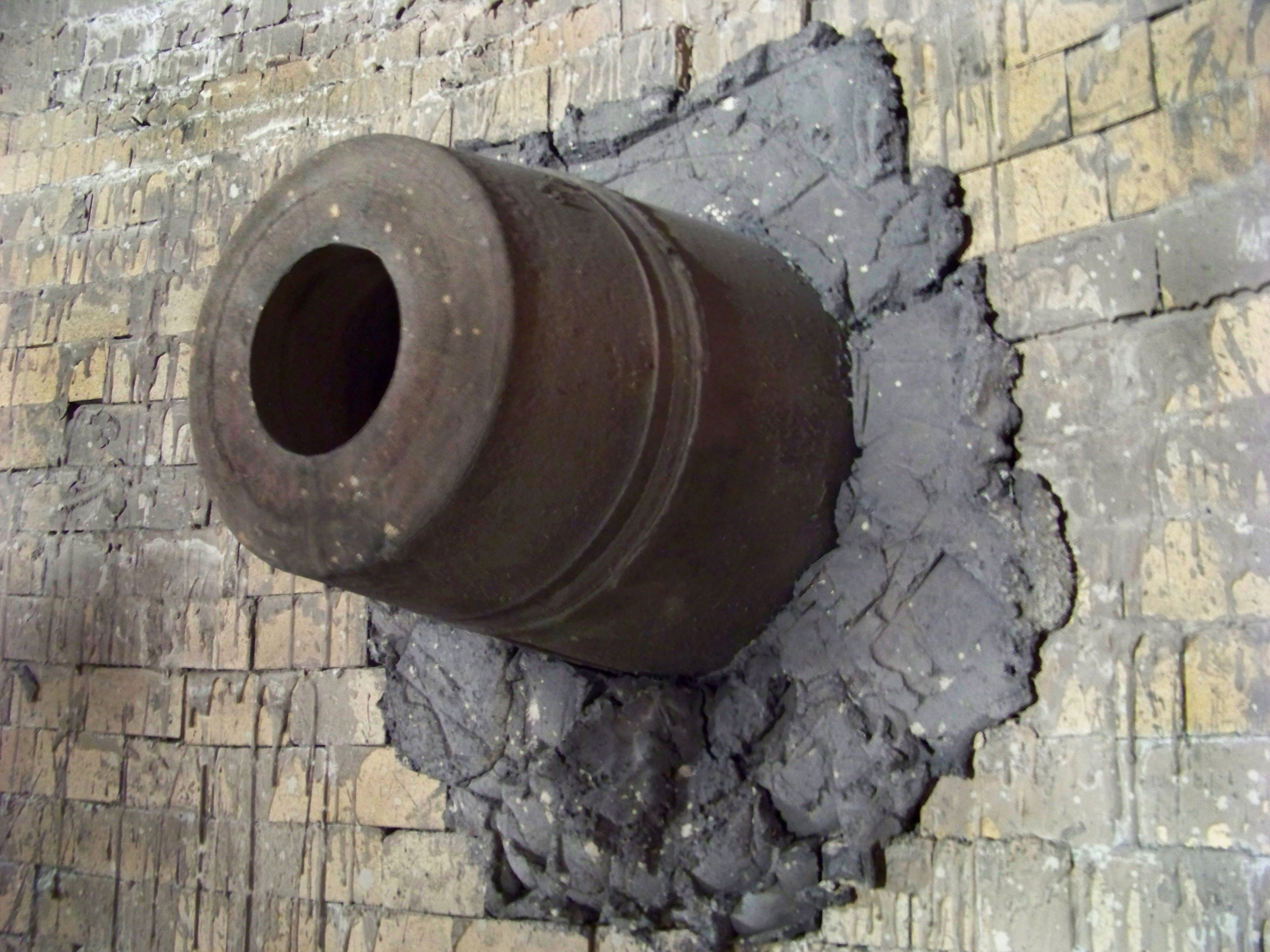
A tuyere, seen from inside a blast furnace

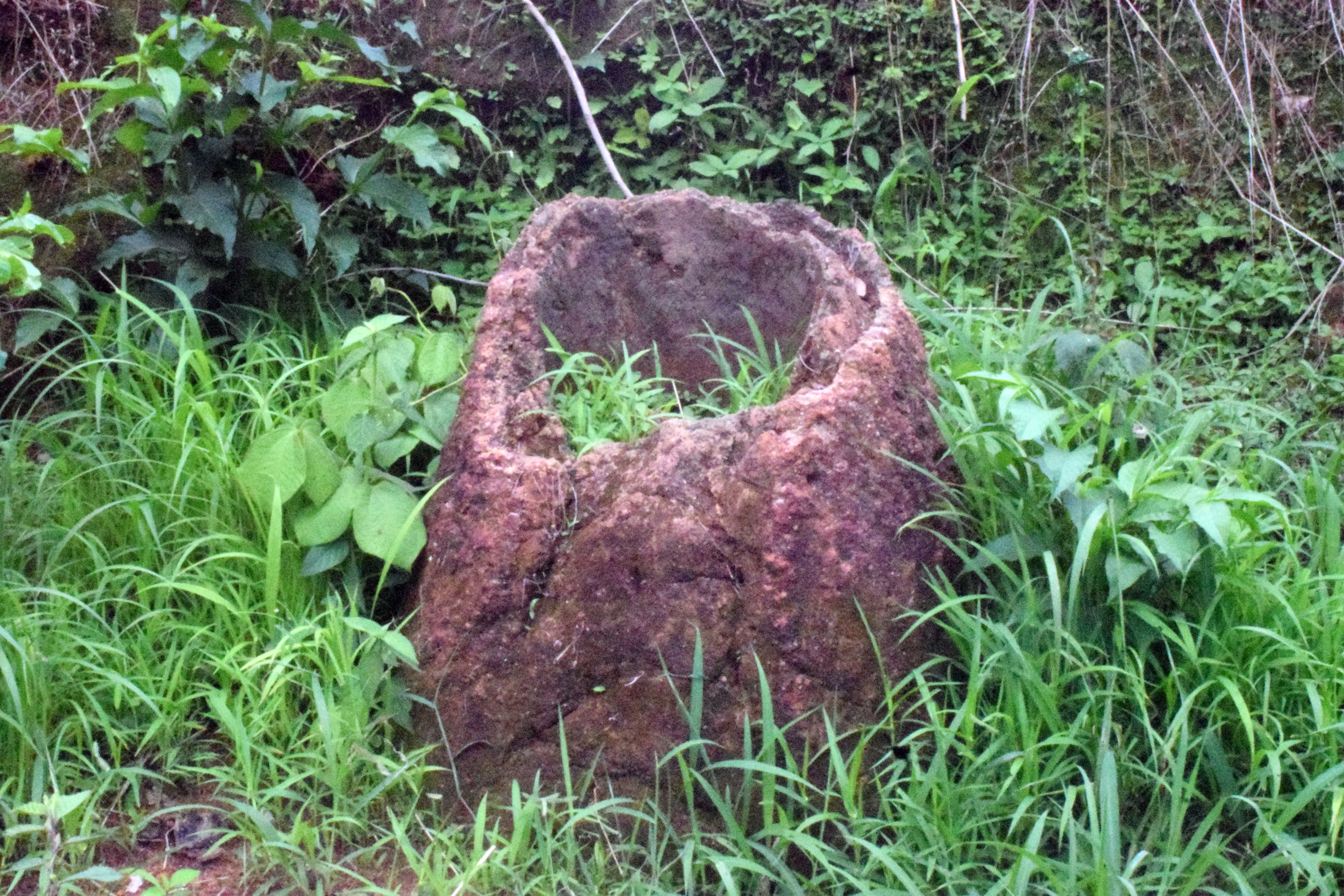
An old tuyere in Nok, Nigeria

A tuyere, or tuyère (French pronunciation: [tɥijɛʁ]; English: /twiːˈjɛər/), is a tube, nozzle or pipe allowing the blowing of air into a furnace or hearth.

Air or oxygen is injected into a hearth under pressure from bellows or a blowing engine or other devices. This causes the fire to become hotter in front of the blast than it would otherwise have been, enabling metals to be smelted or melted or made hot enough to be worked in a forge, though these are blown only with air. This applies to any process where a blast is delivered under pressure to make a fire hotter. Archeologists have discovered tuyeres dating from the Iron Age; one example dates from between 770 BCE and 515 BCE.

Following the introduction of hot blast, tuyeres are often water-cooled.

Around 1500 CE, new ironmaking techniques, including the blast furnace and finery forge, were introduced into England from France, along with the French technical terms relating to the new technology. "Tuyere" (French: tuyère, lit. 'air vent') is one of these French words, sometimes Anglicised as tue-iron or tue iron.

== Examples ==
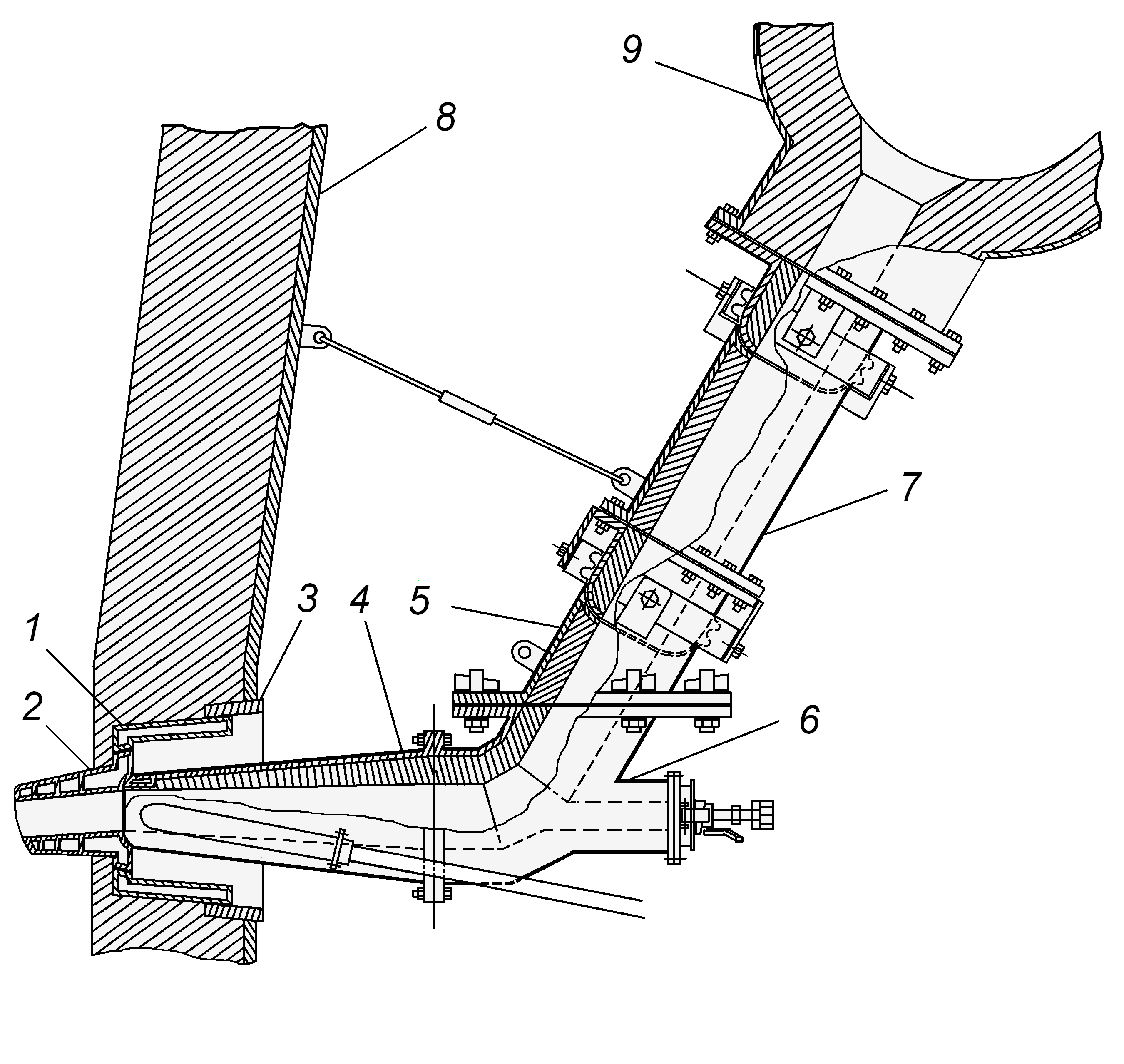
General arrangement of the tuyère (2), tuyère cooler (1), tuyère-cooler holder (3), blowpipe (4) and bustle pipe (9) in a blast furnace

- A bloomery normally has one tuyere.
- Early blast furnaces also had one tuyere, but were fed from bellows perhaps 12 feet (3.7m) long operated by a waterwheel. During the Industrial Revolution, the blast began to be provided using steam engines, initially Watt engines working blowing cylinders. Improvements in foundry practice enabled gas-tight cast iron pipes to be produced, enabling one engine to deliver blast to several sides of a furnace, through multiple tuyeres.
- A finery forge contained finery and chafery hearths, usually one of the latter and one to three of the former. Each hearth was equipped with its own set of bellows, blowing into it through a tuyere.
- The blacksmith's hearth at their forge has a tuyere, often blown by foot-operated bellows.
- Tuyeres were also used in smelting lead and copper in smeltmills.
- As of 2009 the world's largest blast furnace in Caofeidian, China operated by Shougang Jing Tang United Iron and Steel Ltd had 42 tuyeres, through which the hot blast is injected in the furnace. They are usually made from copper and cooled with a water jacket to withstand the extreme temperatures.
