= Shingling =

Stage in production of bar iron or steel

Shingling was a stage in the production of bar iron or steel, in the finery and puddling processes. As with many ironmaking terms, this is derived from the French - cinglage, from the verb cingler ("to strike iron in order to forge it"), first attested in the Larousse dictionary of 1866.

The product of the finery was a bloom or loop (from old Frankish luppa or lopp, meaning a shapeless mass); that of the puddling furnace was a puddled ball. In each case, this needed to be consolidated by hammering it into a more regular shape. This was done manually with heavy hammers; later by a waterwheel or steam powered hammers, leading to modern power hammers. A widely used example was the steam hammer developed by James Nasmyth in 1839, originally conceived to forge large wrought-iron components such as paddle shafts. The result was an oblong-shaped iron product similar in appearance to shingles used on roofs. In the finery, this was part of the work of the finer; during puddling, it was done by a special workman called the shingler, who transferred the ball onto the anvil of the shingling hammer to force out slag. The iron (or steel) then had to be further shaped (drawn out) under the hammer or rolled in a rolling mill to produce a bar. Grades of iron such as "best" or "best best" were already differentiated at this stage of manufacture. In more recent times, the process was carried out using mechanical jaws to squeeze the puddled ball into shape.
