= Finery forge =

Forge for making wrought iron from pig iron

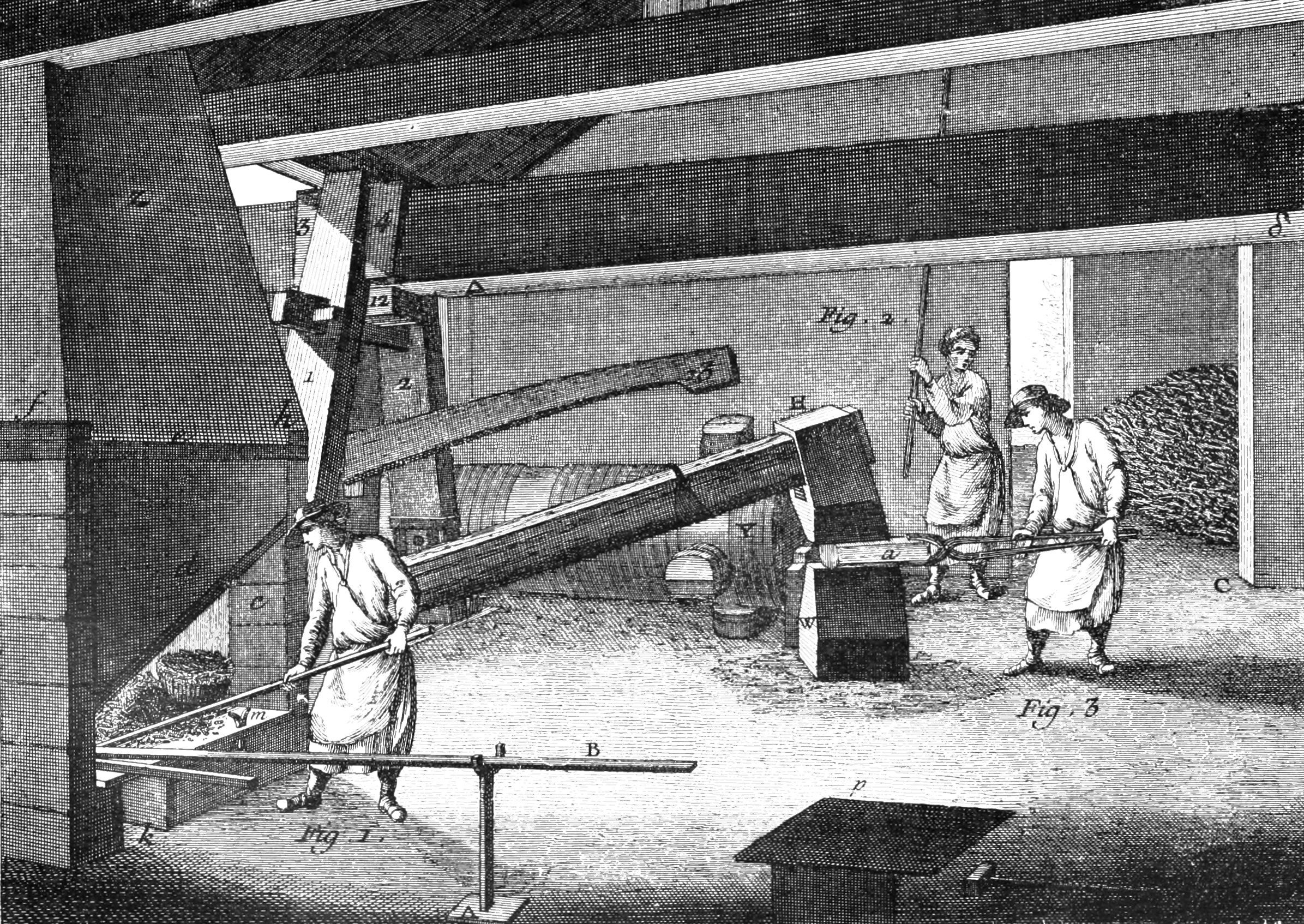
Hearth (left) and trip hammer (centre) in a finery forge. In the back room (right) is a large pile of charcoal.

A finery forge is a forge used to produce wrought iron from pig iron by decarburization in a process called "fining" which involved liquifying cast iron in a fining hearth and removing carbon from the molten cast iron through oxidation. Finery forges were used as early as the 3rd century BC in China. The finery forge process was replaced by the puddling process and the roller mill, both developed by Henry Cort in 1783–4, but not becoming widespread until after 1800.

== History ==
Fining was practiced in ancient China by the mid-3rd century BC, although Wagner notes that its precise chronology and geographical origins are uncertain. During the Han dynasty (202 BC-AD 220), cast iron was converted into wrought iron by several methods; solid-state decarburization is securely attested, while fining also appears to have been practiced. Small hearths excavated at several Han-period iron production sites, including Tieshenggou, have been interpreted as fining hearths. Further evidence may be provided by a 1st-2nd-century AD Shandong tomb relief interpreted as depicting fining and a 4th-5th century passage in the Taiping Jing interpreted by Wagner as referring to fining.

In Europe, the process of producing wrought iron from pig iron using a blast furnace and fining hearth emerged during the Middle Ages. Archaeological evidence indicates the use of blast furnaces in parts of Europe by the 12th and 13th centuries, with the resulting high-carbon pig iron refined into wrought iron by fining. The process subsequently became widespread in European iron production developing into several regional forms. From the late 18th century, finery forges were increasingly replaced by newer methods, particularly puddling, which allowed coal to be used as the fuel instead of charcoal. Some finery forges nevertheless remained in use into the 19th century.

== Types ==
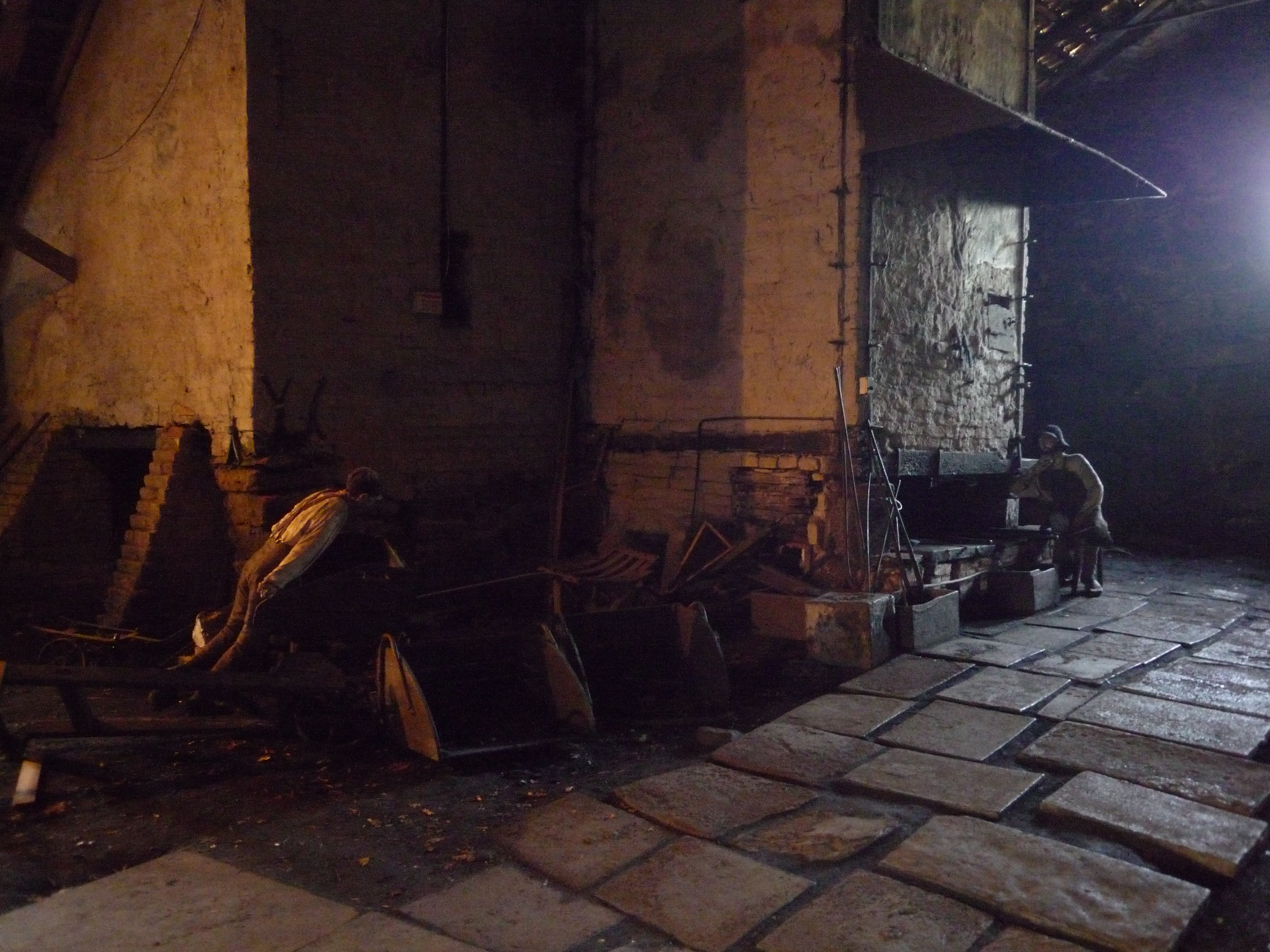
Interior of the preserved Walloon forge in Österbybruk, Uppland

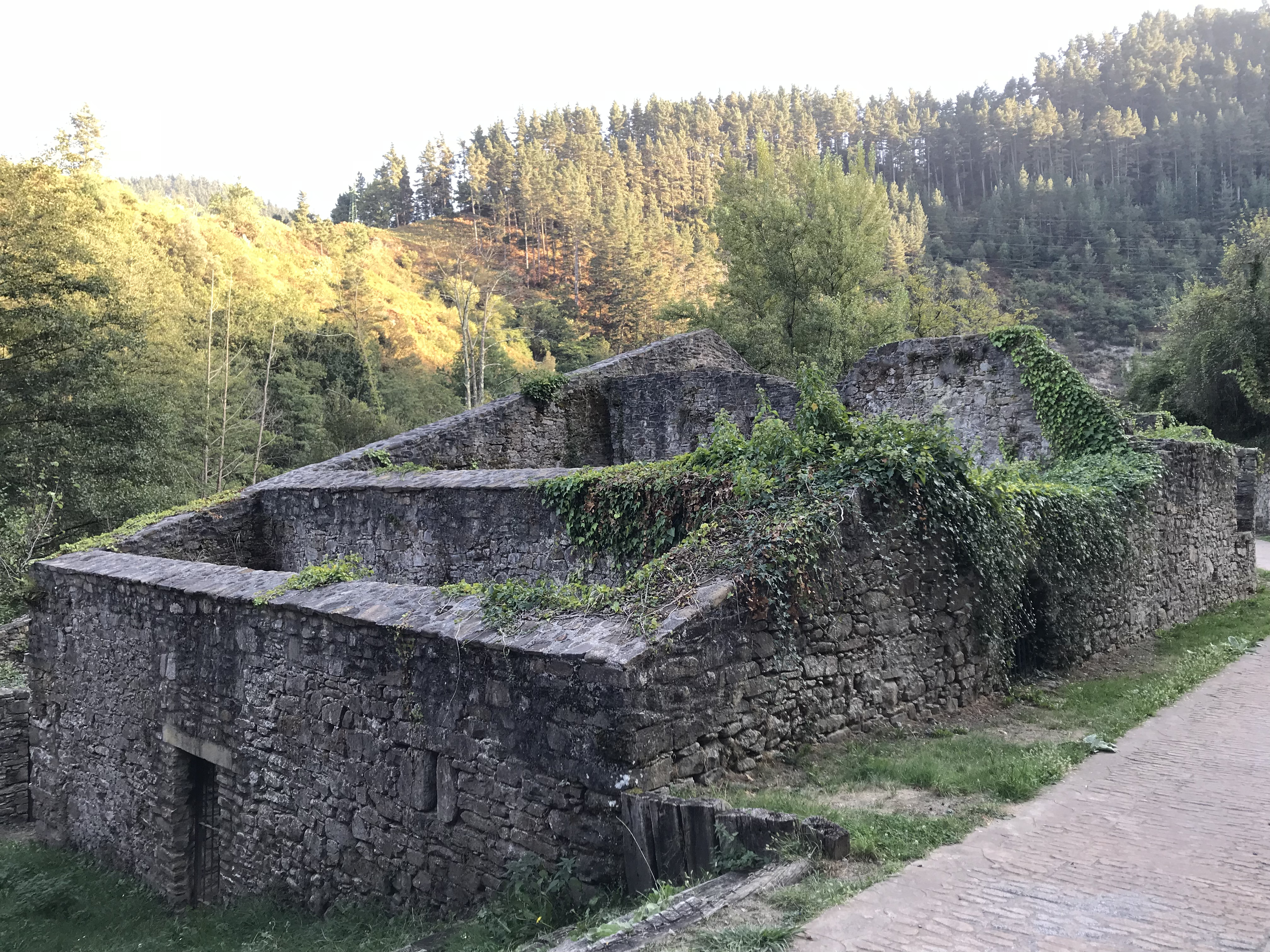
Exterior of the remnants of a Basque forge

There were several types of finery forges.

=== German forge ===
The dominant type in Sweden was the German forge, which had a single hearth that was used for all processes.

=== Walloon forge ===
In Swedish Uppland north of Stockholm and certain adjacent provinces, another kind known as the Walloon forge was used, mainly for the production of a particularly pure kind of iron known as oregrounds iron, which was exported to England to make blister steel. Its purity depended on the use of ore from the Dannemora mine. The Walloon forge was virtually the only kind used in Great Britain.

The forge had two kinds of hearths, the finery to finish the product and the chafery to reheat the bloom that was the raw material of the process.

== Process ==
In the finery, a workman known as the "finer" remelted pig iron so as to oxidise the carbon (and silicon). This produced a lump of iron (with some slag) known as a bloom. This was consolidated using a water-powered hammer (see trip hammer) and returned to the finery.

The next stages were undertaken by the "hammerman", who in some iron-making areas such as South Yorkshire was also known as the "stringsmith", who heated his iron in a string-furnace. Because the bloom is highly porous, and its open spaces are full of slag, the hammerman's or stringsmith's tasks were to beat (work) the heated bloom with a hammer to drive the molten slag out of it, and then to draw the product out into a bar to produce what was known as anconies or bar iron. In order to do this, he had to reheat the iron, for which he used the chafery. The fuel used in the finery had to be charcoal (later coke), as impurities in any mineral fuel would affect the quality of the iron.

=== Slag ===
The waste product was allowed to cool in the hearth and removed as a "mosser". In the Furness district they were often left as the capstone of a wall, particularly near Spark Bridge and Nibthwaite forges.

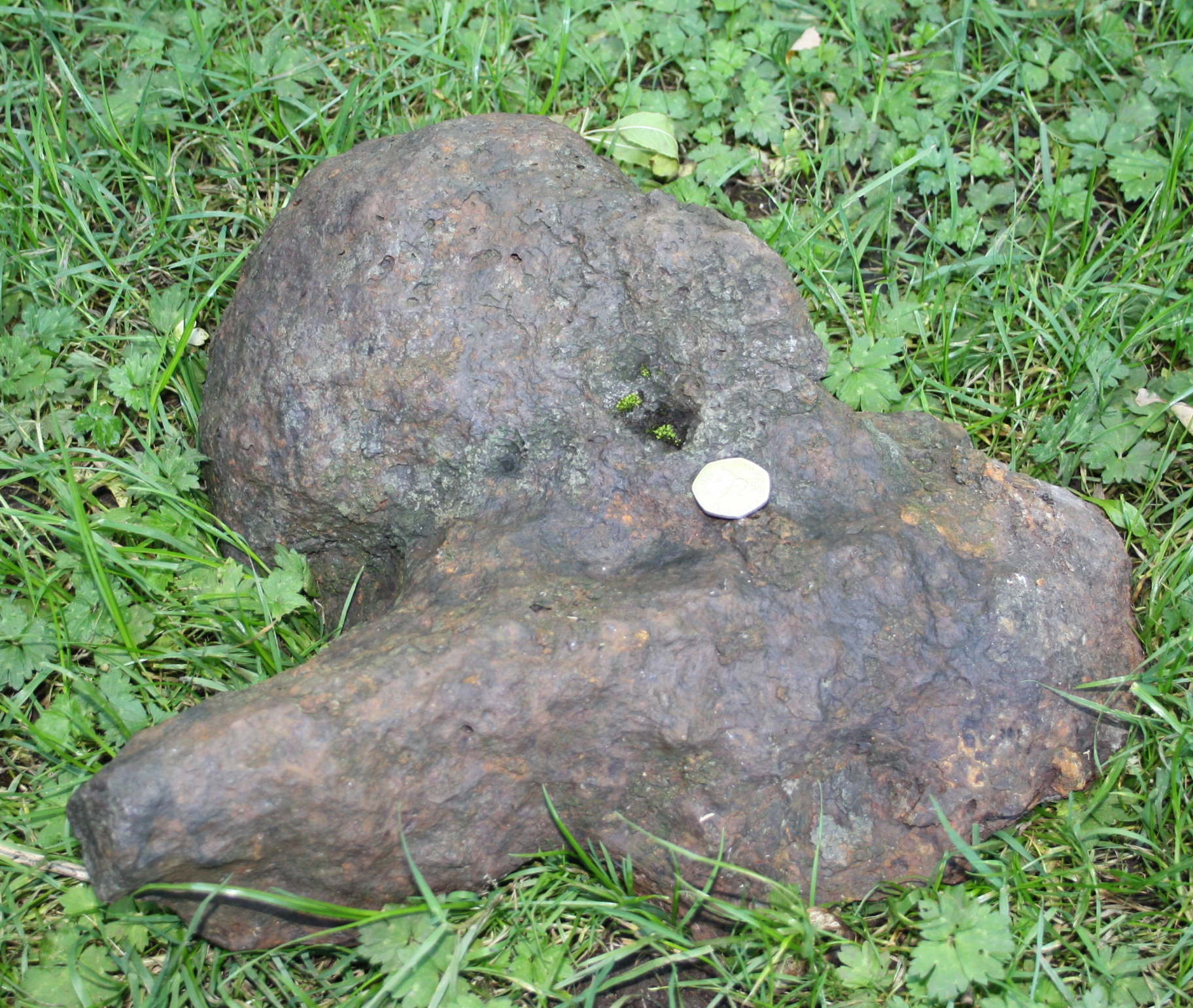
Mosser found near Newland Furnace

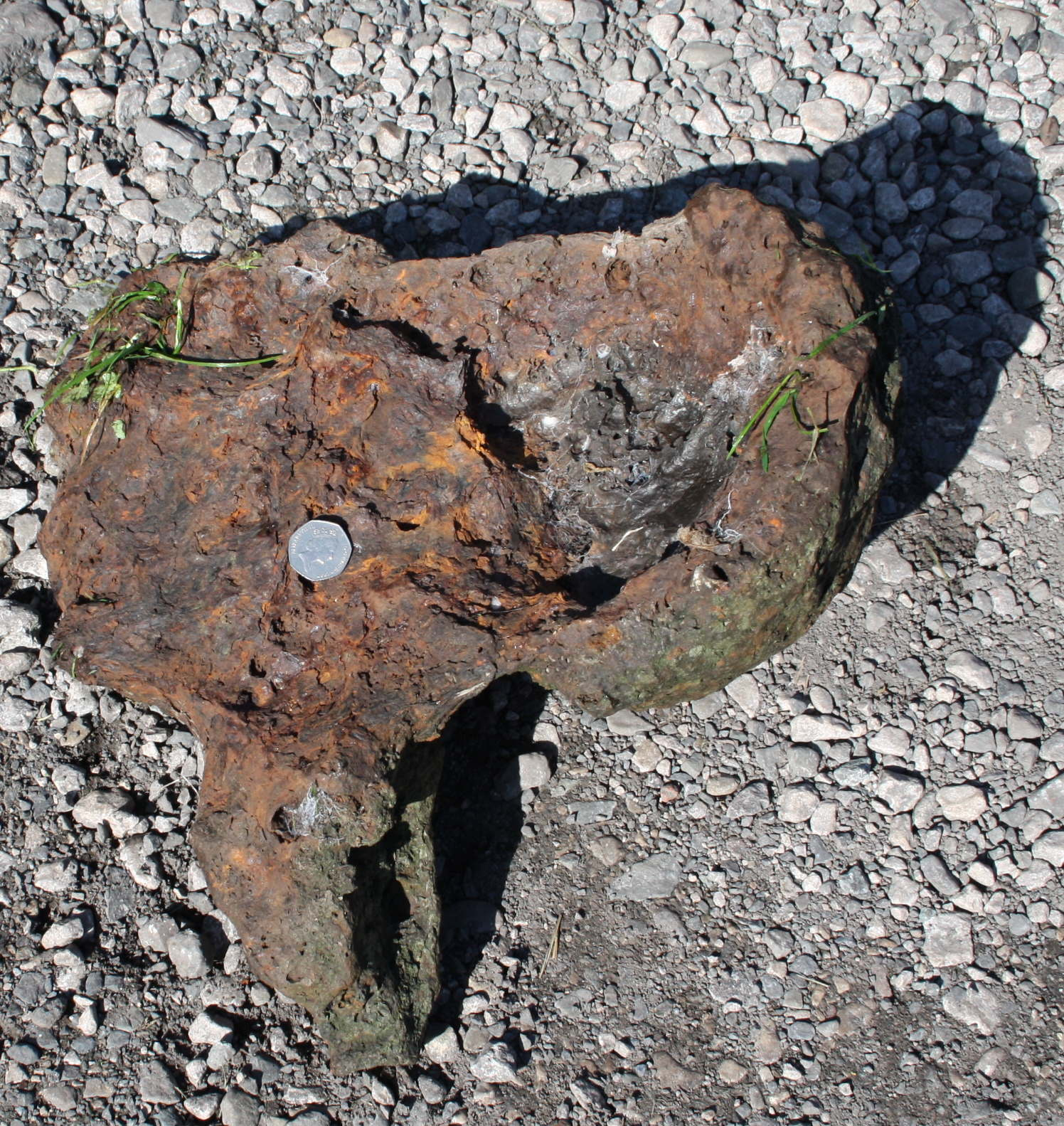
Mosser found near Newland Furnace

== Sources ==
- H. Schubert, History of British Iron and Steel Industry c.450 BC to AD 1775 (1957), 272–291.
- A. den Ouden, "The Production of Wrought Iron in Finery Hearths", Historical Metallurgy 15(2) (1981), 63–87 and 16(1) (1982), 29–33.
- K-G. Hildebrand, Swedish Iron in the Seventeenth and Eighteenth Centuries: Export Industry Before Industrialization (Stockholm 1992).
- P. King, 'The Cartel in Oregrounds Iron: Trading in the Raw Material for Steel During the 18th century", Journal of Industrial History 6 (2003), 25–48.
