= Österbybruk =

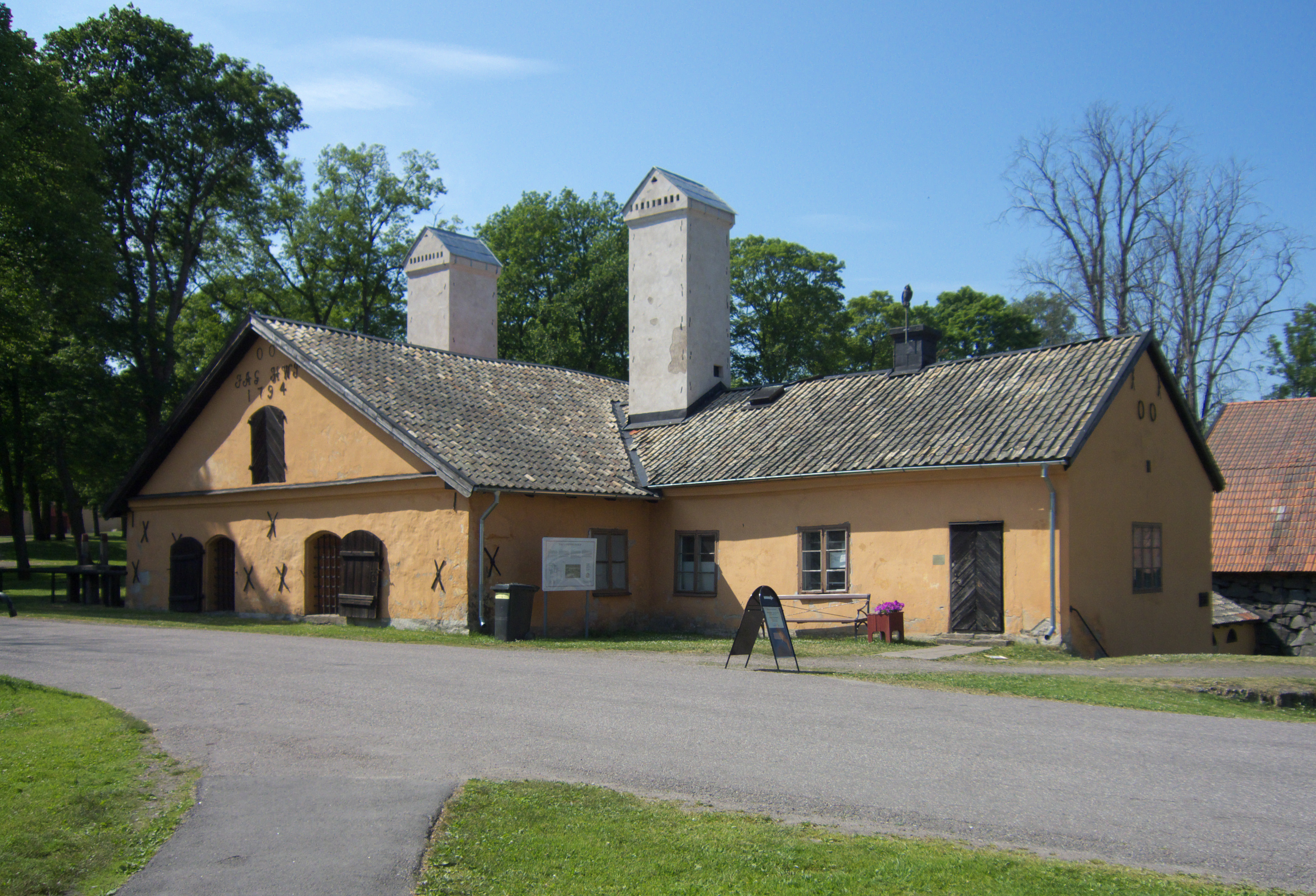
- Walloon forge in Österbybruk

- Location within Uppsala Location within Sweden
- Coordinates: 60°12′N 17°54′E
- Country: Sweden
- Province: Uppland
- County: Uppsala County
- Municipality: Östhammar Municipality

Area
  - Total: 2.51 km^{2} (0.97 sq mi)

Population (31 December 2020)
  - Total: 2,375
  - Density: 946/km^{2} (2,450/sq mi)
- Time zone: UTC+1 (CET)
  - Summer (DST): UTC+2 (CEST)

Österbybruk is a locality situated in Östhammar Municipality, Uppsala County, Sweden with 2,272 inhabitants in 2010.

== Ironworks ==
The Österby works was one of a number mostly in Roslagen, where there were Walloon forges, producing high quality oregrounds iron for export. Österby's brand mark was OO. All iron was branded with that mark. The Österby ironproducts were highly valued in England for the production of blister steel by the cementation process.

The historical complex of Österbybruk is a "Vallonbruk", a social and economic building complex surrounding a forge. Österbybruk is one of the most beautiful examples of the remains of the presence and input of Walloon immigrants ('valloner') in Sweden in the 17th century. More than 1.200 families emigrated in that era to Sweden, where the expertise of Walloon master blacksmiths was highly sought after. They helped to launch the Swedish iron and metal industry. The number of their descendants is estimated today between 500.000 and 1 million people.

== People ==
- Karl Kilbom, the leader of the Swedish Communist Party 1924-1929 was born here, and one of the main streets of Österbybruk is named after him today.

== Climate ==
Österbybruk has a humid continental climate that is quite mild throughout the year, especially considering its northerly latitude.

Climate data for Österbybruk, 2002-2015 (precipitation 1961-1990)
Month	Jan	Feb	Mar	Apr	May	Jun	Jul	Aug	Sep	Oct	Nov	Dec	Year
Record high °C (°F)	10.0 (50.0)	11.9 (53.4)	17.7 (63.9)	27.4 (81.3)	28.6 (83.5)	30.6 (87.1)	34.4 (93.9)	32.8 (91.0)	27.6 (81.7)	20.6 (69.1)	14.4 (57.9)	12.6 (54.7)	34.4 (93.9)
Mean daily maximum °C (°F)	−0.5 (31.1)	0.2 (32.4)	4.4 (39.9)	10.9 (51.6)	15.9 (60.6)	19.7 (67.5)	23.0 (73.4)	21.6 (70.9)	16.6 (61.9)	9.4 (48.9)	4.4 (39.9)	1.1 (34.0)	10.5 (50.9)
Daily mean °C (°F)	−3.5 (25.7)	−3.1 (26.4)	−0.1 (31.8)	5.3 (41.5)	10.0 (50.0)	14.4 (57.9)	17.3 (63.1)	16.0 (60.8)	11.5 (52.7)	5.7 (42.3)	1.9 (35.4)	−1.7 (28.9)	6.1 (43.0)
Mean daily minimum °C (°F)	−6.6 (20.1)	−6.5 (20.3)	−4.6 (23.7)	−0.2 (31.6)	4.2 (39.6)	8.1 (46.6)	11.6 (52.9)	10.5 (50.9)	6.4 (43.5)	2.0 (35.6)	−0.6 (30.9)	−4.4 (24.1)	1.6 (34.9)
Record low °C (°F)	−34.0 (−29.2)	−30.4 (−22.7)	−27.3 (−17.1)	−13.8 (7.2)	−5.6 (21.9)	−2.0 (28.4)	1.0 (33.8)	−1.0 (30.2)	−4.7 (23.5)	−15.6 (3.9)	−20.9 (−5.6)	−32.4 (−26.3)	−34.0 (−29.2)
Average precipitation mm (inches)	46.5 (1.83)	32.5 (1.28)	33.2 (1.31)	35.0 (1.38)	31.7 (1.25)	38.8 (1.53)	74.6 (2.94)	73.8 (2.91)	58.9 (2.32)	55.1 (2.17)	62.0 (2.44)	51.6 (2.03)	593.6 (23.37)
Source 1: SMHI
Source 2: SMHI Monthly Data 2002-2015
