= Oregrounds iron =

High-grade English iron

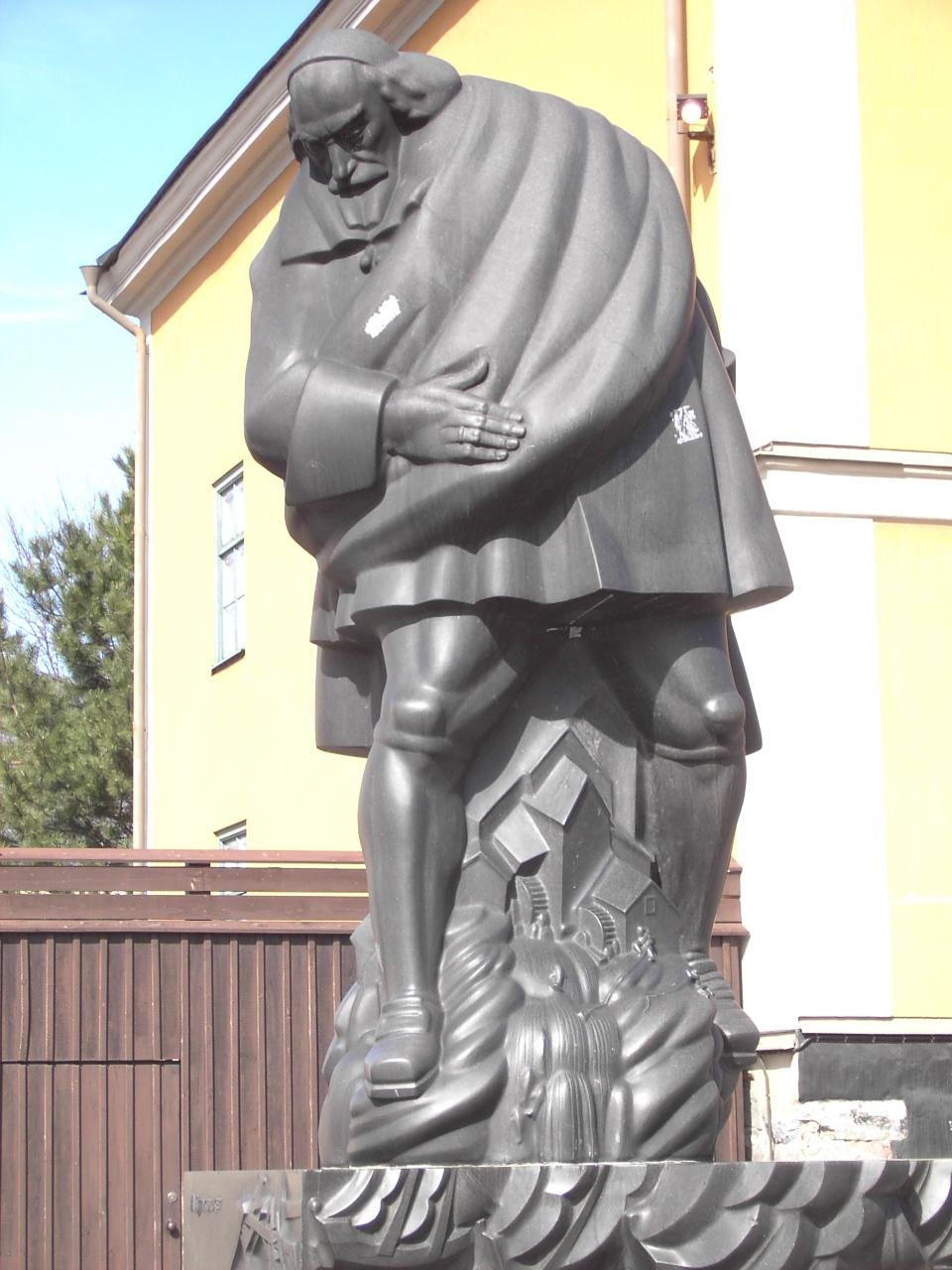
Statue of Louis de Geer (1587–1652) in Norrköping, Sweden. De Geer introduced the Walloon method to Sweden.

Oregrounds iron was a grade of iron that was regarded as the best grade available in 18th-century England. The term was derived from the small Swedish city of Öregrund, the port from which the bar iron was shipped. It was produced using the Walloon process.

Oregrounds iron is the equivalent of the Swedish vallonjärn, which literally translates as Walloon iron. The Swedish name derives from the iron being produced by the Walloon version of the finery forge process, the Walloon process as opposed to the German method, which was more common in Sweden. Actually, the term is more specialised, as all the Swedish Walloon forges made iron from ore ultimately derived from the Dannemora mine. It was made in about 20 forges mainly in Uppland.

Many of the ironworks were founded by Louis de Geer and other Dutch entrepreneurs who set up ironworks in Sweden in the 1610s and 1620s, with blast furnaces and finery forges. Most of the early forgemen were also from Wallonia.

== Origins in Wallonia ==
The technique was developed in Wallonia in present-day Belgium during the Middle Ages. The Walloon method consisted of making pig iron in a blast furnace, followed by refining it in a finery forge. The process was devised in the Liège region, and spread into France and thence from the Pays de Bray to England before the end of the 15th century. Louis de Geer took it to Roslagen in Sweden in the early 17th century, where he employed Walloon ironmakers. Iron made there by this method was known in England as oregrounds iron.

== Quality, uses and marketing ==
Swedish law required bars of iron to have the forge's mark stamped into it for quality control reasons. In Britain, the iron was known by these 'marks', and the quality of each brand was well-known to the buyers in London, Sheffield, Birmingham and elsewhere. It was divided into two grades:

- 'First oregrounds' came from Österby ('double bullet'), Leufsta (now Lövsta – hoop L) and Åkerby (PL crown). Later Gimo joined them.
- 'Second oregrounds' came from the other forges, including Forsmark, Harg, Vattholma and Ullfors.

What made Oregrounds iron unique was its purity. The manganese content of the Dannemora ore caused impurities, which would otherwise have remained in the iron, to react preferentially with the manganese and to be carried off into the slag. This level of purity meant that the iron was particularly suitable for conversion to steel by being re-carburised, using the cementation process. This made it particularly suitable for making steel and oregrounds iron was an indispensable raw material for metal manufactures, particularly the Sheffield cutlery industry. Substantial quantities were also (until about 1808) bought for use by the British Navy.

This and other uses absorbed substantially the whole output of the industry. The trade in oregrounds iron was controlled from the 1730s to the 1850s by a cartel of merchants, of whom the longest enduring members were the Sykes family of Hull. Other participants were resident in (or controlling imports through) London and Bristol. These merchants advanced money to Swedish exporting houses, which in turn advanced it to the ironmasters, thus buying up the output of the forges several years in advance.
