= Decarburization =

Decrease of the carbon content in metals (usually steel)

Decarburization (or decarbonization) is the process of decreasing carbon content, which is the opposite of carburization.

The term is typically used in metallurgy, describing the decrease of the content of carbon in metals (usually steel). Decarburization occurs when the metal is heated to temperatures of 700 °C or above when carbon in the metal reacts with gases containing oxygen or hydrogen. The removal of carbon removes hard carbide phases resulting in a softening of the metal, primarily at the surfaces which are in contact with the decarburizing gas.

Decarburization can be either advantageous or detrimental, depending on the application for which the metal will be used. It is thus both something that can be done intentionally as a step in a manufacturing process, or something that happens as a side effect of a process (such as rolling) and must be either prevented or later reversed (such as via a carburization step).

The decarburization mechanism can be described as three distinct events: the reaction at the steel surface, the interstitial diffusion of carbon atoms and the dissolution of carbides within the steel.

== Chemical reactions ==
The most common reactions are:

C + CO_{2} ↔ 2 CO (the Boudouard reaction)
C + H_{2}O ↔ CO + H_{2}
C + 2 H_{2} ↔ CH_{4}

Other reactions are:

C + 1/_{2} O_{2} → CO
C + O_{2} → CO_{2}
C + FeO → CO + Fe

== Electrical steel ==
Electrical steel is one material that uses decarburization in its production. To prevent the atmospheric gases from reacting with the metal itself, electrical steel is annealed in an atmosphere of nitrogen, hydrogen, and water vapor, where oxidation of the iron is specifically prevented by the proportions of hydrogen and water vapor so that the only reacting substance is carbon being oxidized into carbon monoxide (CO).

== Stainless steel ==
Stainless steel contains additives which are highly oxidizable, such as chromium and molybdenum. Such steels can only be decarburized by reacting with dry hydrogen, which has no water content, unlike wet hydrogen, which is produced in a way that includes some water and can otherwise be used for decarburization.

== As a secondary effect ==
Incidental decarburization can be detrimental to surface properties in products (where carbon content is desirable) when done during heat treatment or after rolling or forging, because the material is only affected to a certain depth according to the temperature and duration of heating. This can be prevented by using an inert or reduced-pressure atmosphere, applying resistive heating for a short duration, by limiting the time that the material is submitted to a high heat, as it is done in a walking-beam furnace, or through restorative carburization, which uses a hydrocarbon atmosphere to transfer carbon into the surface of the material during annealing. The decarburized surface of the material can also be removed by grinding.

== See also ==
- High-temperature hydrogen attack (detrimental)
- History of ferrous metallurgy
- Steelmaking
