= Foundry Products Operations =

Former American metal casting company

- Company type: Subsidiary
- Industry: Foundry
- Founded: 1907
- Defunct: 1988
- Fate: Sold
- Headquarters: Oakley, suburb of Cincinnati, Ohio, United States
- Parent: Cincinnati Milling Machine Company 1907-1970; Milacron, Inc. 1970-1988

Foundry Products Operations was a subsidiary operation of the Cincinnati Milling Machine Company (CMM), a company which no longer exists. Some parts of the company evolved into the present Milacron, Inc. and Cincinnati Machine. CMM relied heavily on castings for the manufacturing of its machine tool products. The castings were produced at Cincinnati foundries owned by CMM (and later, Milacron, Inc.) and at foundries independent of CMM, between 1907 and 1988.

== History ==
=== Beginnings of CMM reliance on castings ===
In 1884 the Cincinnati Screw and Tap Company was incorporated. The company was in the business of making screws and taps, but also began to make machine tools. A basic component in machine tools at this time was gray iron castings. The company bought castings from jobbing foundries for the machine tools it manufactured. Some of the Cincinnati local foundries which supplied to the machine tool company included the Blackburn Foundry, Buckeye Foundry Company, the Steel Foundry Company (Cincinnati) and others.

In 1889 the screw and tap business was sold off, as the company focused on machine tool business. It was renamed as the Cincinnati Milling Machine Co. (CMM). CMM continued to operate in the central business district of Cincinnati and purchased castings from a number of local foundries.

In 1905 the company was sold in total to Frederick A. Geier, who became president. Geier had been a partner in the concern previously. Until this time the company had had some problems with the locations in the business district: at least one flood and a fire had caused it to relocate.

=== Relocation to Oakley ===
A map showing the location of the Modern Foundry on the left side of the map, at the corner of Marburg and Disney Avenue. The Factory Power building is to the left. Rail tracks were laid to bring raw materials into the power station and the foundry, and to move products from the foundry. Click on image to enlarge.

In October 1906 CMM announced plans for a new vertically integrated factory to be built in Oakley, a suburb of Cincinnati. A 102-acre (0.41 km^{2}) site was purchased which was named the Factory Colony. This site was developed to include a two-story administration building 62 × 120 feet (37 m), a foundry building 62 × 280 feet (85 m), a building for cleaning castings and storing 62 × 530 feet (160 m), a charging building 62 × 180 feet (55 m), and a pattern shop 62 × 180 feet (55 m). These buildings would be all of brick and steel construction. A few months later the company announced the foundry would be 350 × 450 feet (140 m), with the pattern shop to be 50 × 160 feet (49 m). A power house would also be erected with a size of 75 × 100 feet. The foundry was planned to provide castings to all companies which would locate to the new industrial park.

Geier reasoned a captive foundry operation was needed because "the uncertain supply of castings had been a great handicap to production at a time when demand was far greater than our ability to supply".

A few months after making the construction announcement, CMM announced they were leasing a foundry on Patternson Street in Cincinnati, to be occupied by the Modern Foundry until the construction was completed in Oakley. The Modern Foundry was the beginnings of what became the Foundry Products Operations of the Cincinnati Milling Machine Company.

The foundry was erected by the Interstate Engineering Company, opening in 1907. It was the first production facility in the new industrial park, as a separate organization called the Modern Foundry and was located at the corner of Marburg and Disney Street in Oakley. The new foundry was fully operational by 1908 and could melt 30 tons per day in its cupola furnaces.

The foundry also organized with other foundries in Cincinnati: Lunkenheimer, Buckeye Foundry Company and the John B. Morris Foundry, to form the Associated Foundries of Cincinnati, supplying castings to Cincinnati industry. The first manager of the Modern Foundry was Walter H. Geier.

By the mid-1930s the Factory Colony was considered one of the world's largest manufacturers of machine tools and employed thousands of workers.

=== Chosen to represent the foundry industry in a mural ===
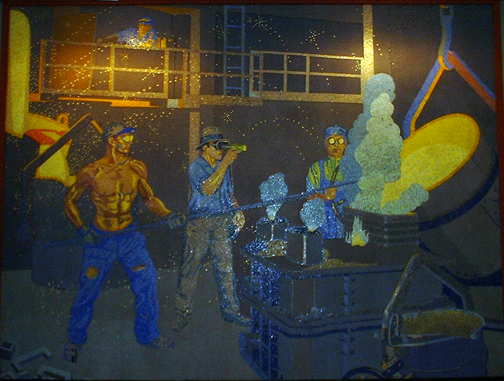
A mural at Cincinnati/Northern Kentucky International Airport, originally at the Cincinnati Union Terminal depicting Foundry Products Operations

Winold Reiss was contracted to produce murals depicting workers in Cincinnati industries, for the new Cincinnati Union Terminal. To depict the foundry industry, he visited the Modern Foundry to get ideas and set a scene for one of the murals, called Foundry and Machine Shop Products. In this mural, a man (modeled by Joseph Schwope, 1898–1980) is skimming a ladle of iron, while an iron pourer (modeled by Bill Rengering, 1901–1985) pours a mold. A metallurgist (modeled by Emil Weston, 1900–1990) measures the metal temperature using an optical pyrometer. In the background a cupola tender (Bill Ennix, 1886–1944) watches over the work. One source credits the model for the cupola tender as being Howard Fredericks.

A copy of the original photograph is shown in the book They Built a City: 150 Years of Industrial Cincinnati.

After visiting the Modern Foundry for a couple days, and after everything was arranged as Reiss wanted to capture the depiction of the foundry industry, the photograph was taken during the pouring of a mold. Reiss made a sketch of the elements he wanted to include from the photograph, simplifying certain elements for his mural. He submitted this sketch to the Ravenna Mosaic Company of Italy for production into the tesserae medium of the mosaic. The glass tesserae pieces were attached to paper and shipped to Cincinnati Union Terminal. The paper-backed pieces were pressed into the plaster on the terminal wall. Interstitial places were filled with colored mortar. In 1973, when the terminal concourse was to be torn down, this mural and 13 others by Reiss were carefully removed and transported for display at Cincinnati/Northern Kentucky International Airport.

=== Preparations for a new expansion, gearing up for war ===
In the early 1930s Frederick V. Geier (son of Frederick A. Geier) was sent to Germany to explore the possibility of establishing an operation there for manufacturing machine tools. He was shocked by the scale of industrial development and concluded a war in Europe was imminent. He believed that the United States needed to make changes to support its needs and those of its allies.

The foundry operation was licensed to produce iron under the Meehanite process in 1935 for the cupola operation. In 1937 the Blackburn Foundry was taken over to support production of large castings. In 1938, based on his studies of what was happening in Europe and despite a deep recession, Geier launched a program to double the plant size, including construction of a new foundry.

=== New Foundry ===
The New Foundry opened and poured its first heat by December 1940, about a year before the Attack on Pearl Harbor. With the opening of the New Foundry, the company tore down the old Modern Foundry. At this site, it developed additional machining and assembly space, which enabled a seven-fold increase in production during World War II. The Modern Foundry poured its last heat in 1941.

The Metal Fabricating Division foundry, as it came to be called, supplied all the needs of the Cincinnati Milling Machine Company and its successor, Milacron, Inc. At least three buildings were constructed, totaling more than 300,000 square feet (28,000 m^{2}).

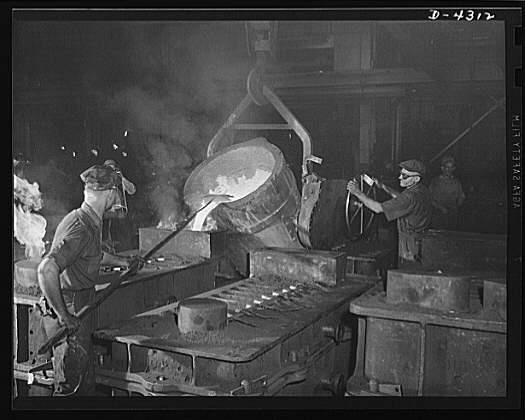
Pouring a large mold is a fiery sight. To the left, flames are shooting from an escape hole -- caused by gas generated by the contact of iron with the relatively cool sand, graphite, linseed oil and other ingredients involved in the mold structure. The man at the left is wielding a skimmer to hold back any impurities floating on the surface of the ladle iron. This photo was taken in January 1942 by the Farm Security Administration but the foundry name was not published for security reasons. It is held in the Office of War Information Photograph Collection (Library of Congress).

By 1942 the Cincinnati Milling Machine Company Foundry (CMM Co. Foundry) was producing 35,000 tons of castings, with an additional 32,000 tons being purchased from other sources. Melting in the New Foundry was done by up to four cupola furnaces. Production in the foundry was around the clock, seven days a week. Additional castings were needed, and the 'Mill' turned to outside Cincinnati local foundries. At total of 27 outside foundries were also supplying castings to the Mill.

==== Army-Navy "E" Award ====
Cincinnati Milling Machine received the prestigious Army-Navy "E" Award on March 6, 1942, in part through the efforts of the New Foundry and the other local foundries in supplying thousands of castings, which were used to produce 17,511 machine tools in 1942 alone to gear up for war. Late in the World War II era, they dropped production considerably, to less than half of that amount, to about 15,000 tons per year.

=== Post war ===
At the end of the war and into the 1950s, production stabilized at about 12,000 tons per year, with purchased castings at about 3,000 tons per year. The CMM Co. Foundry also produced castings for direct sales to other customers, but at a low rate of about 1,000 tons per year. Because the foundry was wholly owned by CMM, other machine tool makers were reluctant to have their competitor making castings for them. In the late postwar period, Cincinnati local foundries had an excess production capacity.

The production of castings was similar to the way they were made since the early days of founding. Molding was done with green sand until sometime in the 1960s or 1970s, when the furan molding process was adopted for medium and large sized castings. Melting continued using the cupola. Most requirements on the foundry were for gray iron, the material normally used in machine tool castings. With the discovery of ductile iron, the foundry began producing ductile in the 1950s, using open ladle treatments or the Gazal porous plug process. Not many machine tool parts were needed in ductile iron.

=== Castings for overseas production facilities ===
In 1964 Milacron constructed an entirely new foundry in England to supply castings for its European machine tool business. This foundry was known as Cincinnati Milacron Ltd, Foundry Operations, Tamworth, England. In the 1970s and 1980s the company was the largest single employer in Biggleswade, Bedfordshire, England.

=== Change in the 1970s ===
In the 1970s, great changes came to the machine tool industry, especially in Cincinnati. Milacron diversified its interests by developing machines that made plastic products . A large part of its success in making machinery was in the use of ductile iron in the plastic injection machinery.

=== Sale to Cast-Fab Technologies ===
In 1988, Cincinnati Milacron, Inc. restructured and reorganized the company. It sold the Met-Fab Division facility, including the Oakley foundry. In the previous ten-year period, Milacron had invested more than $8 million in the 400,000-square-foot (37,000 m^{2}) plant.

The sale represented the end of the Foundry Products Operations. The modernized New Foundry was adapted as a metalcasting operation that supplies many companies and customers with a full range of gray and ductile iron castings. Named Cast-Fab Technologies, Inc., this foundry ceased operation in November 2016, transferring remaining business to Elyria Cast-Fab.

As of the end of 2012, the entire 100-acre site that once held the Cincinnati Milling Machine Company was cleared to bare ground, and now hosts a mixed retail/residential development.
