= Magnesium wheels =

Wheels made of magnesium alloys

Magnesium wheels are wheels manufactured from alloys which contain mostly magnesium. Magnesium wheels are produced either by casting (metalworking) (where molten metal is introduced into a mold, solidifying within the mold), or by forging (where a prefabricated bar is deformed mechanically). Magnesium has several key properties that make it an attractive base metal for wheels: lightness; a high damping capacity; and a high specific strength. Magnesium is the lightest metallic structural material available. It is 1.5 times less dense than aluminium, so magnesium wheels can be designed to be significantly lighter than aluminium alloy wheels, while exhibiting comparable strength. Many competitive racing wheels are made of magnesium alloy.

== Cast magnesium wheels ==
Taking into account their generally inferior quality compared to forged wheels, the main advantage of cast wheels is the relatively low cost of production. And although cast wheels are more affordable than forged wheels, cast wheels are heavier than forged wheels for a given required load. Manufacturing defects found in cast wheels include cavities or porosity and a different metallurgical microstructure, entailing larger grain size. Cast wheels will tend to fracture upon overbearing high-speed impact, whereas forged wheels will tend to bend. Diecast wheels continued to be used in elite racing such as Formula One, IndyCar, BTCC, MotoGP and World Superbike until mid 1990s, when forged wheel technology became preferred.

== Forged magnesium wheels ==
Forged magnesium wheels are manufactured by mechanically deforming (forging) a prefabricated rod using a powerful forging press. Several somewhat different forging techniques exist, all of them comprising a multi-step process/operation. The resultant forging is subsequently machined (lathe-turned and milled) into the final shape of a wheel by removing excess metal from the forged blank. A forged magnesium wheel is 25 percent lighter than cast wheel. The main disadvantage of forged wheels is the high manufacturing cost. Owing to the typically high costs of finished wheels, forged wheels are still rarely purchased by non-professional drivers for regular road use.

But since forged wheels can be designed to be lighter than cast wheels for a given load, forged wheels do offer fuel economy and other distinct advantages. The forging process allows alignment of the metal fibers and optimization of the directional pattern arrangement along the spokes of a wheel. This, along with the smaller grain size, results in superior mechanical properties and performance characteristics that make forged magnesium wheels widely popular both for motor racing and with knowledgeable driving enthusiasts.

== History ==
The original cast magnesium wheels were made beginning in the 1930s and their production continues today. Some of the biggest brands producing magnesium wheels in the past include Halibrand, American Racing, Campagnolo, Cromodora, Ronal, Technomagnesio, and Watanabe. The popularity of magnesium wheels peaked in 1950‍–‍1960. Magnesium wheels from the middle of 20th century are now considered classic and are highly sought by some classic car enthusiasts. However, those magnesium wheels proved to be impractical because they were prone to corrosion and they were mostly used in racing sports. After 1960's magnesium wheels were gradually replaced by aluminium alloy wheels on the mass market, but not from the competition wheels market. Many manufacturers of magnesium wheels are still operating. A lot of companies continued production after the 1960s, although in lower quantities. Modern scientific and engineering developments led to significant improvements in the quality of magnesium wheels, including high-tech anti-corrosion treatment that extends the lifecycle of a wheel to match or even exceed the life cycle of comparable aluminium alloy wheel. Forged magnesium started to displace sand and gravity die-cast magnesium wheels in the mid-1990s. Up to the end of the 90s Marchesini, DYMAG and Marvic we supplying cast wheels to the elite motorbike racing market. DYMAG also supplied all the Lola and Reynard Indycars until 1998.

== Common issues ==
A notable disadvantage historically affecting magnesium wheels was susceptibility to corrosion. Recent improvements in magnesium surface treatment technology have largely resolved the corrosion issues—to the extent that some manufacturers today offer a 10-year warranty.

A common misconception persists regarding the danger caused by magnesium's flammability. But new improved alloys have been developed over the past fifty years, with no reportable incidents of magnesium wheels catching fire. In fact, the U.S. Federal Aviation Administration has conducted wide-ranging tests over the past decade, concluding that the potential flammability of magnesium is no longer a concern—and even ruling to allow its use in aircraft cabins.

With many challenges solved by modern technological solutions, a number of companies—including Brembo (Marchesini), BBS, OZ, Taneisya, and SMW Engineering—are now producing the next generation of reliable forged magnesium wheels. Additionally, several car and motorcycle manufacturers (Original Equipment Manufacturers, or OEMs) have successfully homologated forged magnesium wheels for use as original equipment. Only a limited number of forgers in the world have the large presses required to manufacture the forgings, from which forged magnesium wheels are machined.

== See also ==
- Alloy wheels
