= Slurry pump =

Pump designed to transport mixtures of liquids and solids

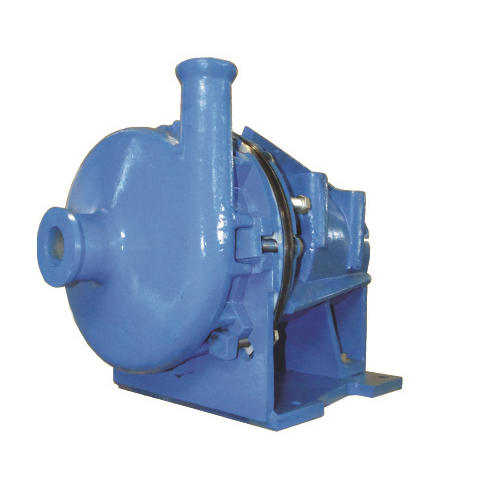
Ray Sanat-AH slurry pump

A slurry pump is a type of pump designed for moving liquid containing substantial solid particles. They are often used in mining. Slurry pumps are more robust than liquid pumps and can withstand wear due to abrasion, and often use parts that are designed to be replaced when worn out.

== Uses ==
Slurry pumps are widely used in transport of abrasive solids in industries such as mining, dredging, and steel. They are often designed to be suitable for heavy-wearing and heavy-duty uses. Depending on the mining process, some slurries are corrosive which presents a challenge because corrosion-resistant materials like stainless steel are softer than high-iron steel.

Slurry is usually classified according to the concentration of solids. Engineering classification of slurry is more complex and involves concentration, particle size, shape and weight in order to determine abrasion severity. For engineering selection of slurry pumps, slurry is classified as class 1, class 2, class 3 and class 4.

== Materials ==
The most common metal alloy used to build slurry pumps is high chrome, which is white iron with 25% chromium added to make it less brittle. Rubber line casings are used for applications where the solid particles are small.

== Components ==
- Impeller - made of elastomer, stainless steel or high-chrome, is the main rotating component which normally has vanes to impart the centrifugal force to the liquid.
- Casing - split outer casing halves of cast contain the wear liners and provide high pressure capabilities. The casing shape is generally semi-volute or concentric, typically less efficient than the volute type.
- Shaft and bearing assembly - large diameter shaft with a short overhang to minimize deflection and vibration. Heavy-duty roller bearings are housed in a removable bearing cartridge.
- Shaft sleeve - hardened, heavy-duty corrosion-resistant sleeve with O-ring seals at both ends to protect the shaft. A split fit allows the sleeve to be removed or installed quickly.
- Shaft Seal - expeller drive seal, packing seal, mechanical seal.
- Drive Type - V-belt drive, gear reducer drive, fluid coupling drive, or frequency conversion drive.

== Types, classification and selection ==
Slurry pumps vary in design and construction to handle different types of slurry, which has varying concentrations of solids, size and shape of solid particles, and composition of the solution. Centrifugal, positive displacement, and vortex pumps can be used for slurry. Centrifugal slurry pumps can have between bearing-supported shafts with split casing or rubber- or metal-lined casing. Configurations include horizontal, vertical suspended and submersible.

Engineers must consider capacity, head, solids handling capacity, efficiency, power, speed, and NPSH. Many factors and corrections to the duty point affect the calculation of brake horsepower and wear. The peripheral speed of the impeller is one of the main distinguishing features. Speed must match the slurry type classification (abrasion classification) in order to achieve a reasonable service life due to abrasion.

=== Submersible ===
Submersible slurry pumps are placed at the bottom of a tank, lagoon, pond, or another water-filled environment, and suction solids and liquids directly at the pump.

=== Self-Priming ===
A self-priming slurry pump is operated from land, and a hose is connected to the pump's intake valve to supply the slurry.

=== Flooded Suction ===
The flooded suction slurry pump is connected to a tank or hopper and uses gravity to move slurry and liquid from the enclosure. Located at the bottom or below the water line, the pump uses gravity to continuously fill the pump and then passes the material out through the discharge valve.
