= Cast iron =

Iron-carbon alloy

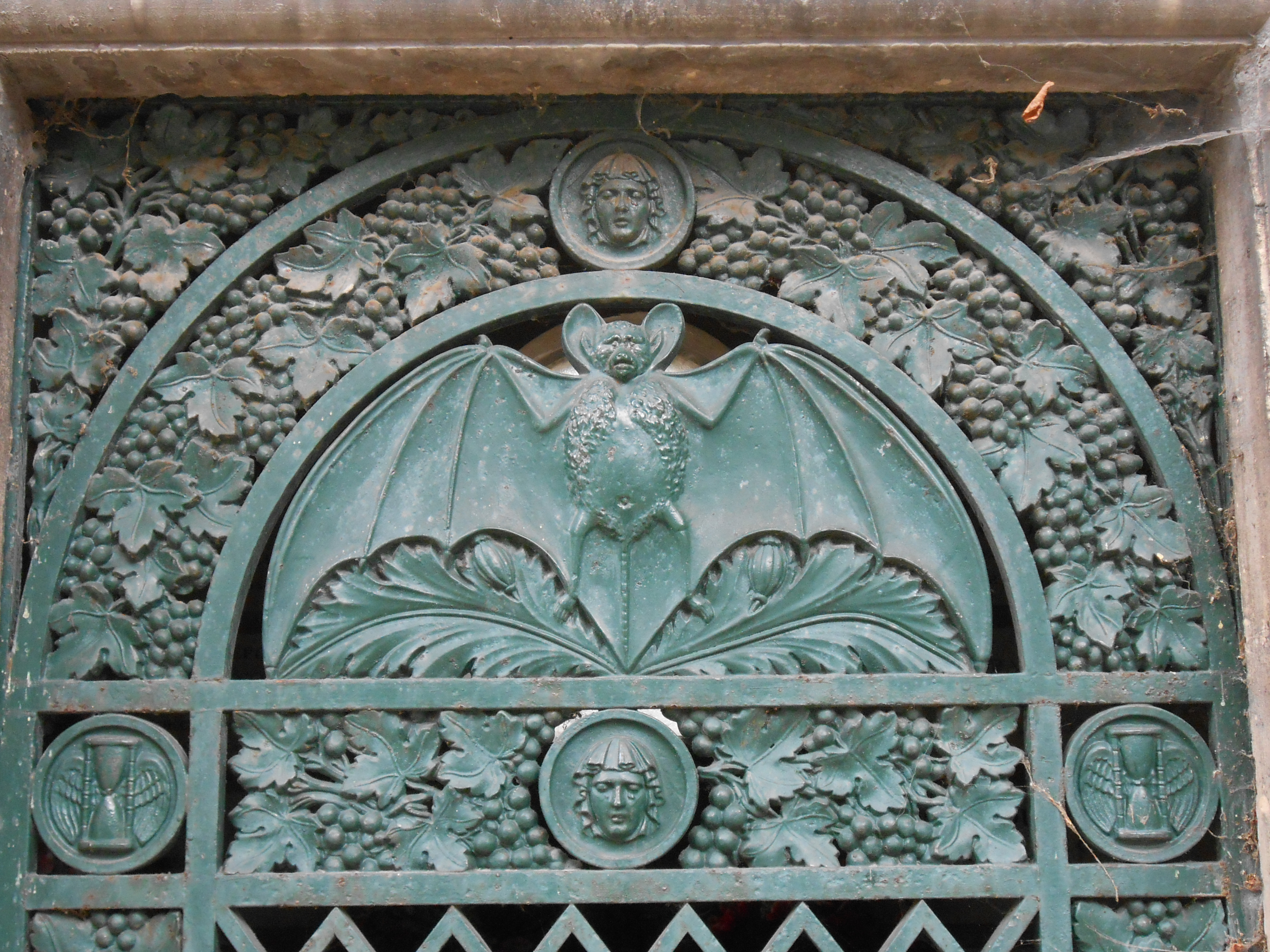
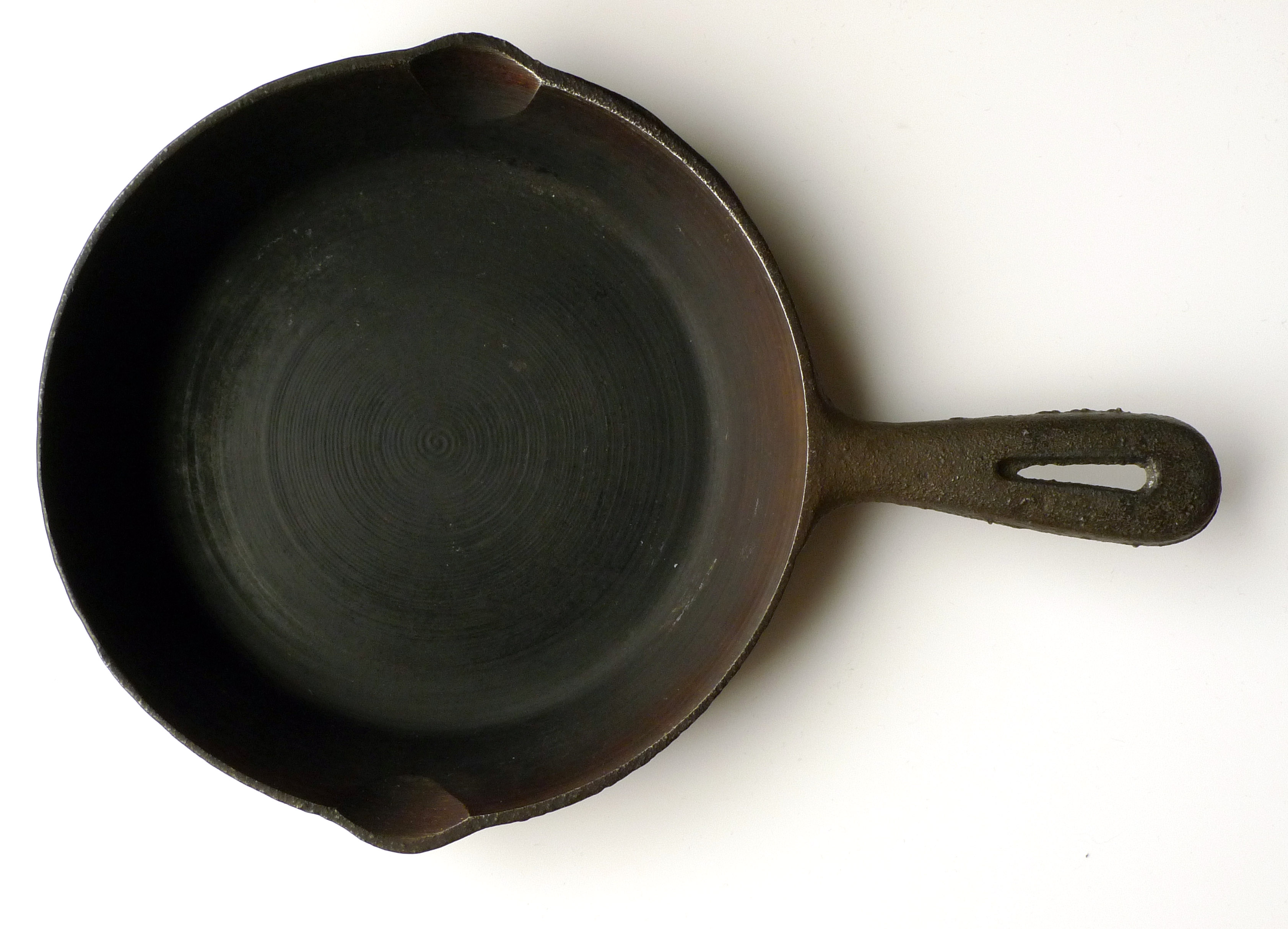
A painted cast iron decorative grate (l) and cast iron cooking skillet (r)

Cast iron is a class of iron–carbon alloys with a carbon content of more than 2% and silicon content around 1–3%. Its usefulness derives from its relatively low melting temperature. The alloying elements determine the form in which its carbon appears: white cast iron has its carbon combined into the iron carbide compound cementite, which is very hard, but brittle, as it allows cracks to pass straight through; grey cast iron has graphite flakes which deflect a passing crack and initiate countless new cracks as the material breaks, and ductile cast iron has spherical graphite "nodules" which stop the crack from further progressing.

Carbon (C), ranging from 1.8 to 4% by weight, and silicon (Si), 1–3% by weight, are the main alloying elements of cast iron. Iron alloys with lower carbon content are known as steel.

Cast iron tends to be brittle, except for malleable cast irons. With its relatively low melting point, good fluidity, castability, excellent machinability, resistance to deformation and wear resistance, cast irons have become an engineering material with a wide range of applications and are used in pipes, machine and automotive industry parts, such as cylinder heads, cylinder blocks and gearbox cases. Some alloys are resistant to damage by oxidation. In general, cast iron is notoriously difficult to weld.

The earliest cast-iron artifacts date to the 8th century BC, and were discovered by archaeologists in what is now Jiangsu, China. Cast iron was used in ancient China to mass-produce weaponry for warfare, as well as agriculture and architecture. During the 15th century AD, cast iron was utilized for cannons and shot in Burgundy, France, and in England during the Reformation. The amounts of cast iron used for cannons required large-scale production. The first cast-iron bridge was built during the 1770s by Abraham Darby III, and is known as the Iron Bridge in Shropshire, England. Cast iron was also used in the construction of buildings.

== Production ==
Cast iron is made from pig iron, which is the product of melting iron ore in a blast furnace. Cast iron can be made directly from the molten pig iron or by re-melting pig iron, often along with substantial quantities of iron, steel, limestone, carbon (coke) and taking various steps to remove undesirable contaminants. Phosphorus and sulfur may be burnt out of the molten iron, but this also burns out the carbon, which must be replaced. Depending on the application, carbon and silicon content are adjusted to the desired levels, which may be anywhere from 2–3.5% and 1–3%, respectively. If desired, other elements are then added to the melt before the final form is produced by casting.

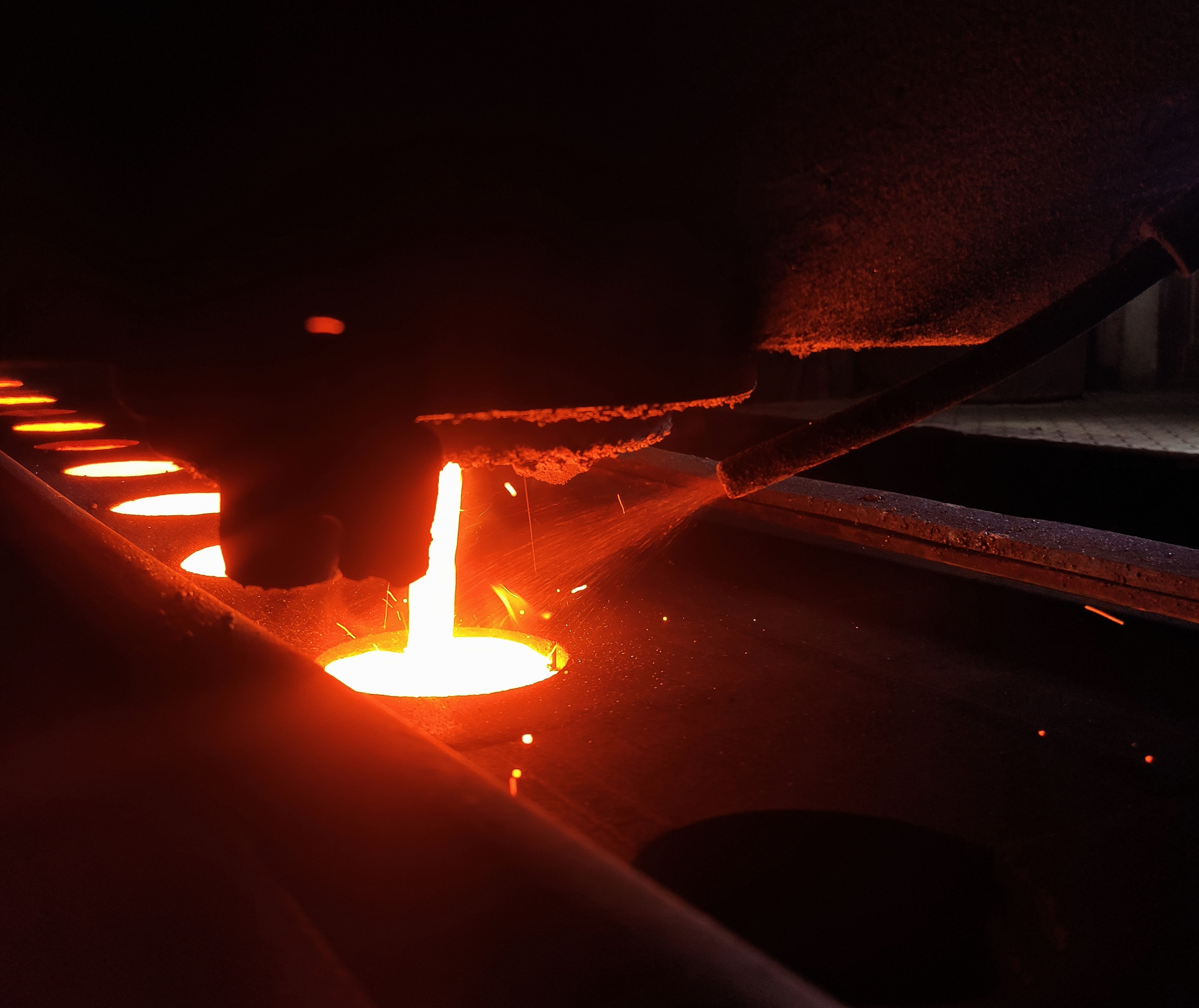
In-stream inoculation addition while molten cast iron is poured to a green sand mold in a foundry

Cast iron is sometimes melted in a special type of blast furnace known as a cupola, but in modern applications, it is more often melted in electric induction furnaces or electric arc furnaces. After melting is complete, the molten cast iron is poured into a holding furnace or ladle.

== Types ==
=== Alloying elements ===
Iron-cementite meta-stable diagram

Cast iron's properties are changed by adding various alloying elements, or alloyants. Next to carbon, silicon is the most important alloyant because it forces carbon out of solution. A low percentage of silicon allows carbon to remain in solution, forming iron carbide and producing white cast iron. A high percentage of silicon forces carbon out of solution, forming graphite and producing grey cast iron. Other alloying agents, manganese, chromium, molybdenum, titanium, and vanadium counteract silicon, and promote the retention of carbon and the formation of those carbides. Nickel and copper increase strength and machinability, but do not change the amount of graphite formed. Carbon as graphite produces a softer iron, reduces shrinkage, lowers strength, and decreases density. Sulfur, largely a contaminant when present, forms iron sulfide, which prevents the formation of graphite and increases hardness. Sulfur makes molten cast iron viscous, which causes defects. To counter the effects of sulfur, manganese is added, because the two form into manganese sulfide instead of iron sulfide. The manganese sulfide is lighter than the melt, so it tends to float out of the melt and into the slag. The amount of manganese required to neutralize sulfur is 1.7 × sulfur content + 0.3%. If more than this amount of manganese is added, then manganese carbide forms, which increases hardness and chilling, except in grey iron, where up to 1% of manganese increases strength and density.

Nickel is one of the most common alloying elements, because it refines the pearlite and graphite structures, improves toughness, and evens out hardness differences between section thicknesses. Chromium is added in small amounts to reduce free graphite, produce chill, and because it is a powerful carbide stabilizer; nickel is often added in conjunction. A small amount of tin can be added as a substitute for 0.5% chromium. Copper is added in the ladle or in the furnace, on the order of 0.5–2.5%, to decrease chill, refine graphite, and increase fluidity. Molybdenum is added on the order of 0.3–1% to increase chill and refine the graphite and pearlite structure; it is often added in conjunction with nickel, copper, and chromium to form high strength irons. Titanium is added as a degasser and deoxidizer, but it also increases fluidity. Vanadium at 0.15–0.5% is added to cast iron to stabilize cementite, increase hardness, and increase resistance to wear and heat. Zirconium at 0.1–0.3% helps to form graphite, deoxidize, and increase fluidity.

In malleable iron melts, bismuth is added at 0.002–0.01% to increase how much silicon can be added. In white iron, boron is added to aid in the production of malleable iron; it also reduces the coarsening effect of bismuth.

=== Grey cast iron ===
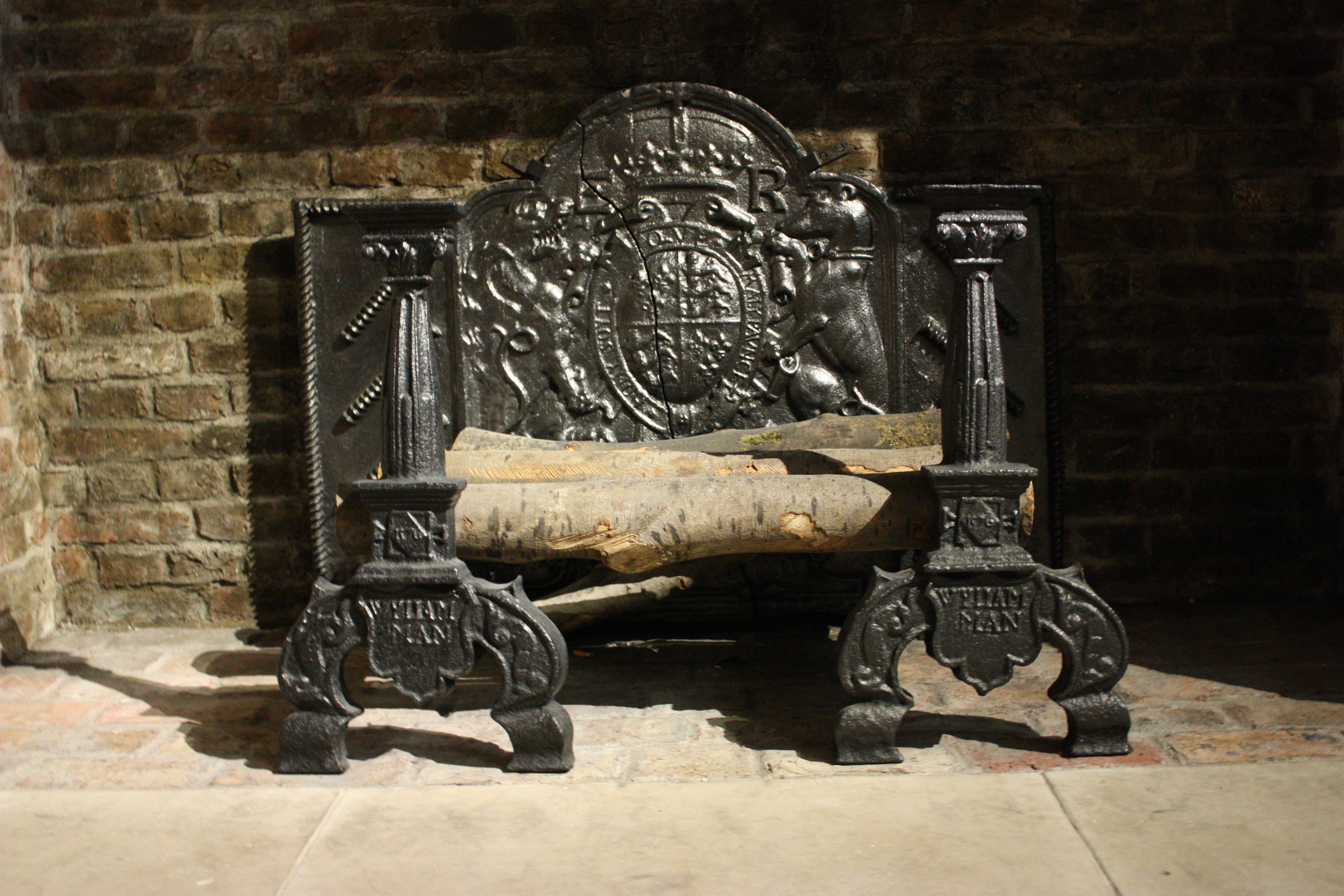
Pair of English firedogs, 1576. These, with firebacks, were common early uses of cast iron, as little strength in the metal was needed.

Grey cast iron is characterised by its graphitic microstructure, which causes fractures of the material to have a grey appearance. It is the most commonly used cast iron and the most widely used cast material based on weight. Most cast irons have a chemical composition of 2.5–4.0% carbon, 1–3% silicon, and the remainder iron. Grey cast iron has less tensile strength and shock resistance than steel, but its compressive strength is comparable to low- and medium-carbon steel. These mechanical properties are controlled by the size and shape of the graphite flakes present in the microstructure and can be characterised according to the guidelines given by the ASTM.

The tribological behavior of structural alloys during sliding friction is strongly influenced by microstructure and phase composition. Austenitic manganese steels and manganese cast irons exhibit complex wear mechanisms associated with strain hardening, plastic deformation of the surface layer and the formation of wear debris during friction. Such materials may develop hardened surface layers during sliding contact, which significantly influences wear resistance and friction stability.

=== White cast iron ===
White cast iron displays white fractured surfaces due to the presence of an iron carbide precipitate called cementite. With a lower silicon content (graphitizing agent) and faster cooling rate, the carbon in white cast iron precipitates out of the melt as the metastable phase cementite, Fe_{3}C, rather than graphite. The cementite which precipitates from the melt forms as relatively large particles. As the iron carbide precipitates out, it withdraws carbon from the original melt, moving the mixture toward one that is closer to eutectic, and the remaining phase is the lower iron-carbon austenite (which on cooling might transform to martensite). These eutectic carbides are much too large to provide the benefit of what is called precipitation hardening (as in some steels, where much smaller cementite precipitates might inhibit plastic deformation by impeding the movement of dislocations through the pure iron ferrite matrix). Rather, they increase the bulk hardness of the cast iron simply by virtue of their own very high hardness and their substantial volume fraction, such that the bulk hardness can be approximated by a rule of mixtures. In any case, they offer hardness at the expense of toughness. Since carbide makes up a large fraction of the material, white cast iron could reasonably be classified as a cermet. White iron is too brittle for use in many structural components, but with good hardness and abrasion resistance and relatively low cost, it finds use in such applications as the wear surfaces (impeller and volute) of slurry pumps, shell liners and lifter bars in ball mills and autogenous grinding mills, balls and rings in coal pulverisers.

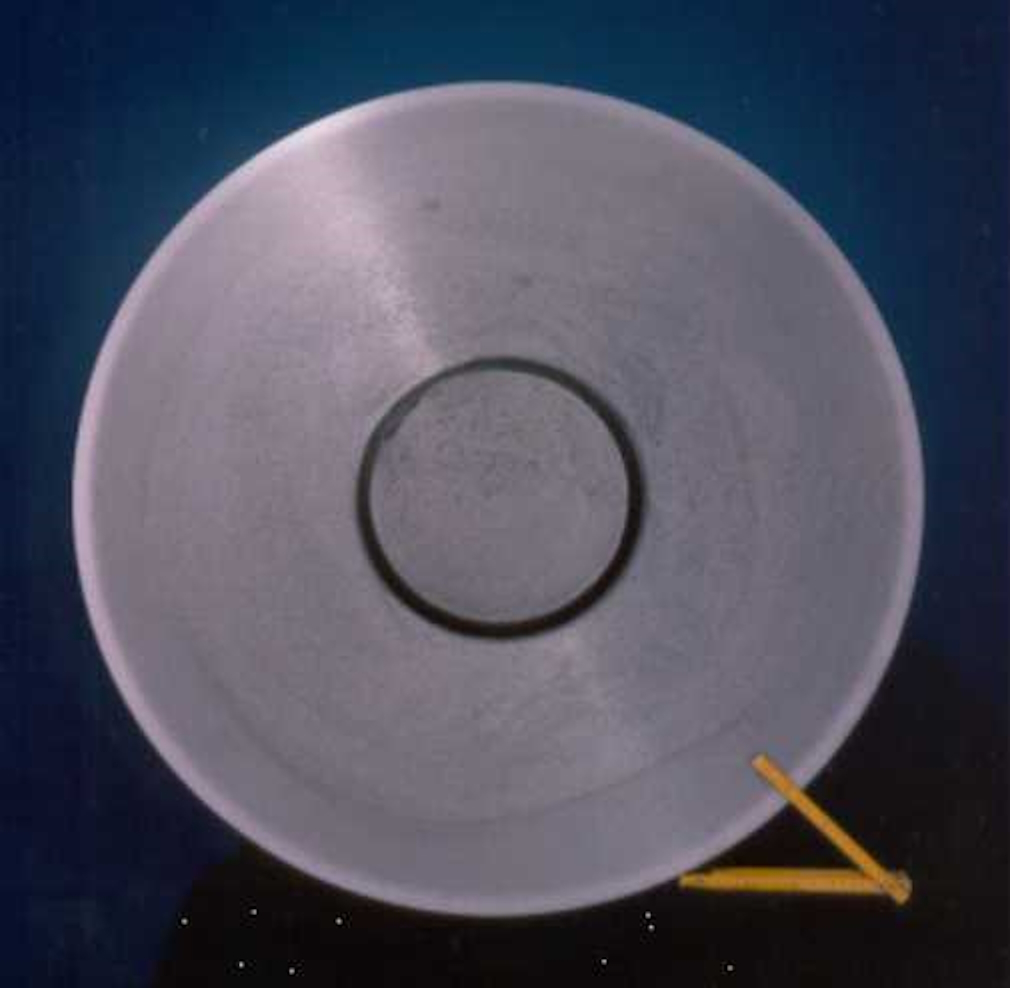
Cross section of chilled cast-iron roll

It is difficult to cool thick castings fast enough to solidify the melt as white cast iron all the way through. However, rapid cooling can be used to solidify a shell of white cast iron, after which the remainder cools more slowly to form a core of grey cast iron. The resulting casting, called a chilled casting, has the benefits of a hard surface with a somewhat tougher interior.

High-chromium white iron alloys allow massive castings (for example, a 10-tonne impeller) to be sand cast, as the chromium reduces cooling rate required to produce carbides through the greater thicknesses of material. Chromium also produces carbides with impressive abrasion resistance. These high-chromium alloys attribute their superior hardness to the presence of chromium carbides. The main form of these carbides are the eutectic or primary M_{7}C_{3} carbides, where "M" represents iron or chromium and can vary depending on the alloy's composition. The eutectic carbides form as bundles of hollow hexagonal rods and grow perpendicular to the hexagonal basal plane. The hardness of these carbides are within the range of 1500-1800HV.

=== Malleable cast iron ===
Malleable iron starts as a white iron casting that is then heat treated for a day or two at about 950 °C (1,740 °F) and then cooled over a day or two. As a result, the carbon in iron carbide transforms into graphite and ferrite plus carbon. The slow process allows the surface tension to form the graphite into spheroidal particles rather than flakes. Due to their lower aspect ratio, the spheroids are relatively short and far from one another, and have a lower cross section vis-a-vis a propagating crack or phonon. They also have blunt boundaries, as opposed to flakes, which alleviates the stress concentration problems found in grey cast iron. In general, the properties of malleable cast iron are more like those of mild steel. There is a limit to how large a part can be cast in malleable iron, as it is made from white cast iron.

=== Ductile cast iron ===
Developed in 1948, nodular or ductile cast iron has its graphite in the form of very tiny nodules with the graphite in the form of concentric layers forming the nodules. As a result, the properties of ductile cast iron are that of a spongy steel without the stress concentration effects that flakes of graphite would produce. The carbon percentage present is 3–4% and percentage of silicon is 1.8–2.8%.Tiny amounts of 0.02 to 0.1% magnesium, and only 0.02 to 0.04% cerium added to these alloys slow the growth of graphite precipitates by bonding to the edges of the graphite planes. Along with careful control of other elements and timing, this allows the carbon to separate as spheroidal particles as the material solidifies. The properties are similar to malleable iron, but parts can be cast with larger sections.

=== Table of comparative qualities of cast irons ===
Comparative qualities of cast irons
Name	Nominal composition [% by weight]	Form and condition	Yield strength [ksi (0.2% offset)]	Tensile strength [ksi]	Elongation [%]	Hardness [Brinell scale]	Uses
Grey cast iron (ASTM A48)	C 3.4, Si 1.8, Mn 0.5	Cast	—	50	0.5	260	Engine cylinder blocks, flywheels, gearbox cases, machine-tool bases
White cast iron	C 3.4, Si 0.7, Mn 0.6	Cast (as cast)	—	25	0	450	Bearing surfaces
Malleable iron (ASTM A47)	C 2.5, Si 1.0, Mn 0.55	Cast (annealed)	33	52	12	130	Axle bearings, track wheels, automotive crankshafts
Ductile or nodular iron	C 3.4, P 0.1, Mn 0.4, Ni 1.0, Mg 0.06	Cast	53	70	18	170	Gears, camshafts, crankshafts
Ductile or nodular iron (ASTM A339)	—	Cast (quench tempered)	108	135	5	310	—
Ni-hard type 2	C 2.7, Si 0.6, Mn 0.5, Ni 4.5, Cr 2.0	Sand-cast	—	55	—	550	High strength applications
Ni-resist type 2	C 3.0, Si 2.0, Mn 1.0, Ni 20.0, Cr 2.5	Cast	—	27	2	140	Resistance to heat and corrosion

== History ==
Cast-iron artifact dated from 8th century BC found in Jiangsu, China

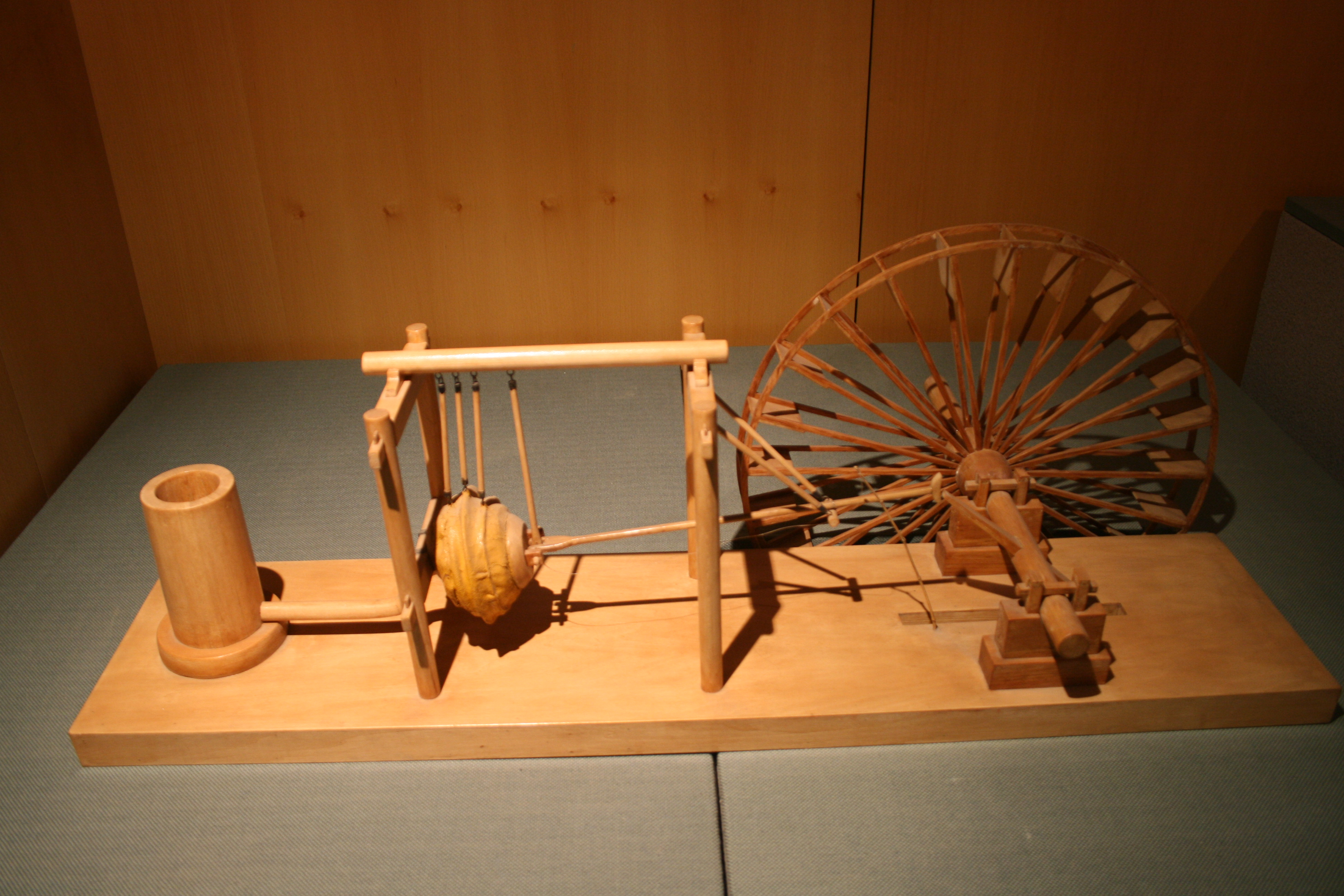
Diorama model of a Han dynasty blast furnace blower

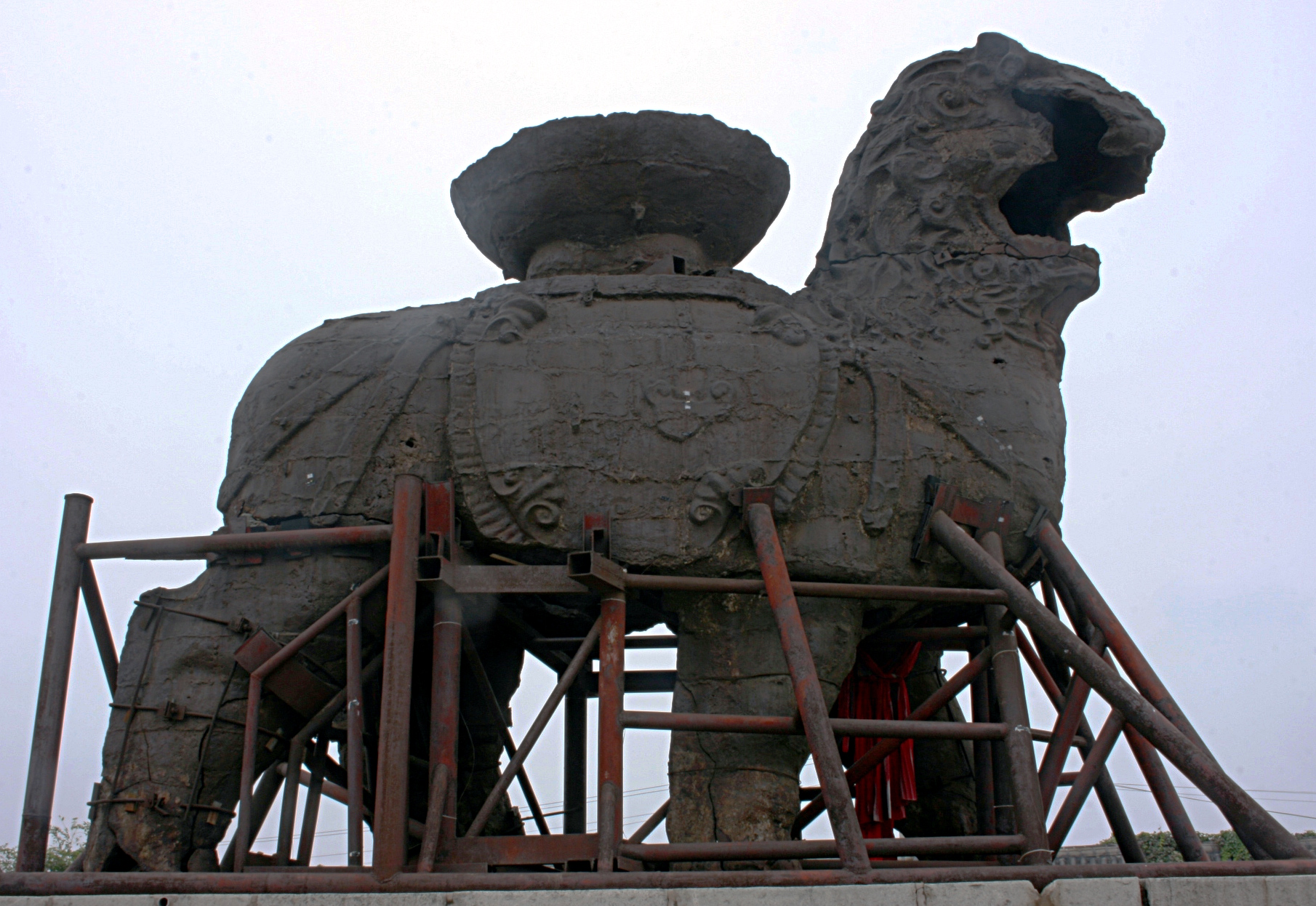
The Iron Lion of Cangzhou, the largest surviving cast-iron artwork from China, 953 AD, Later Zhou period

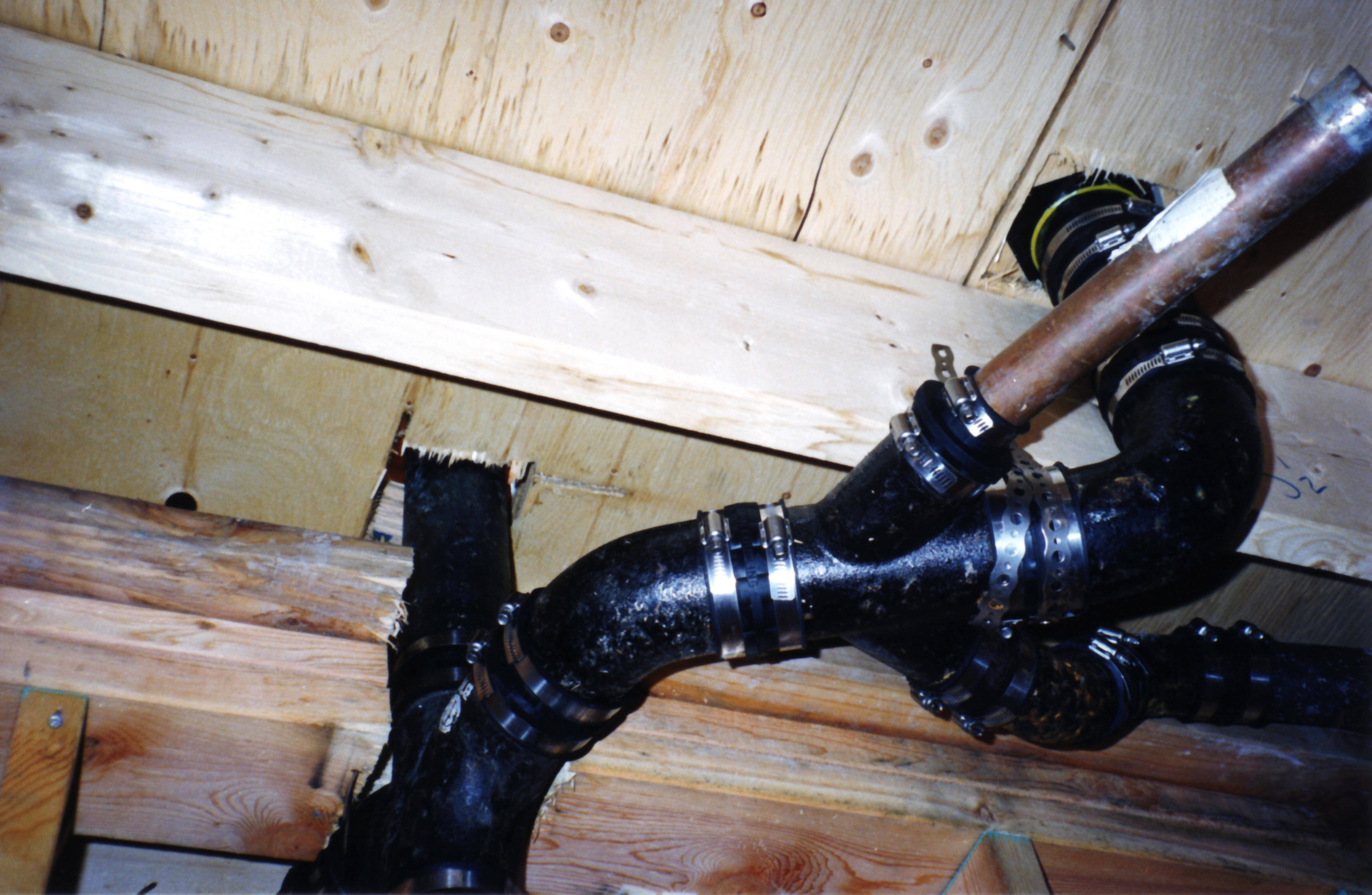
Cast-iron "no hub" drain waste and vent (DWV) piping

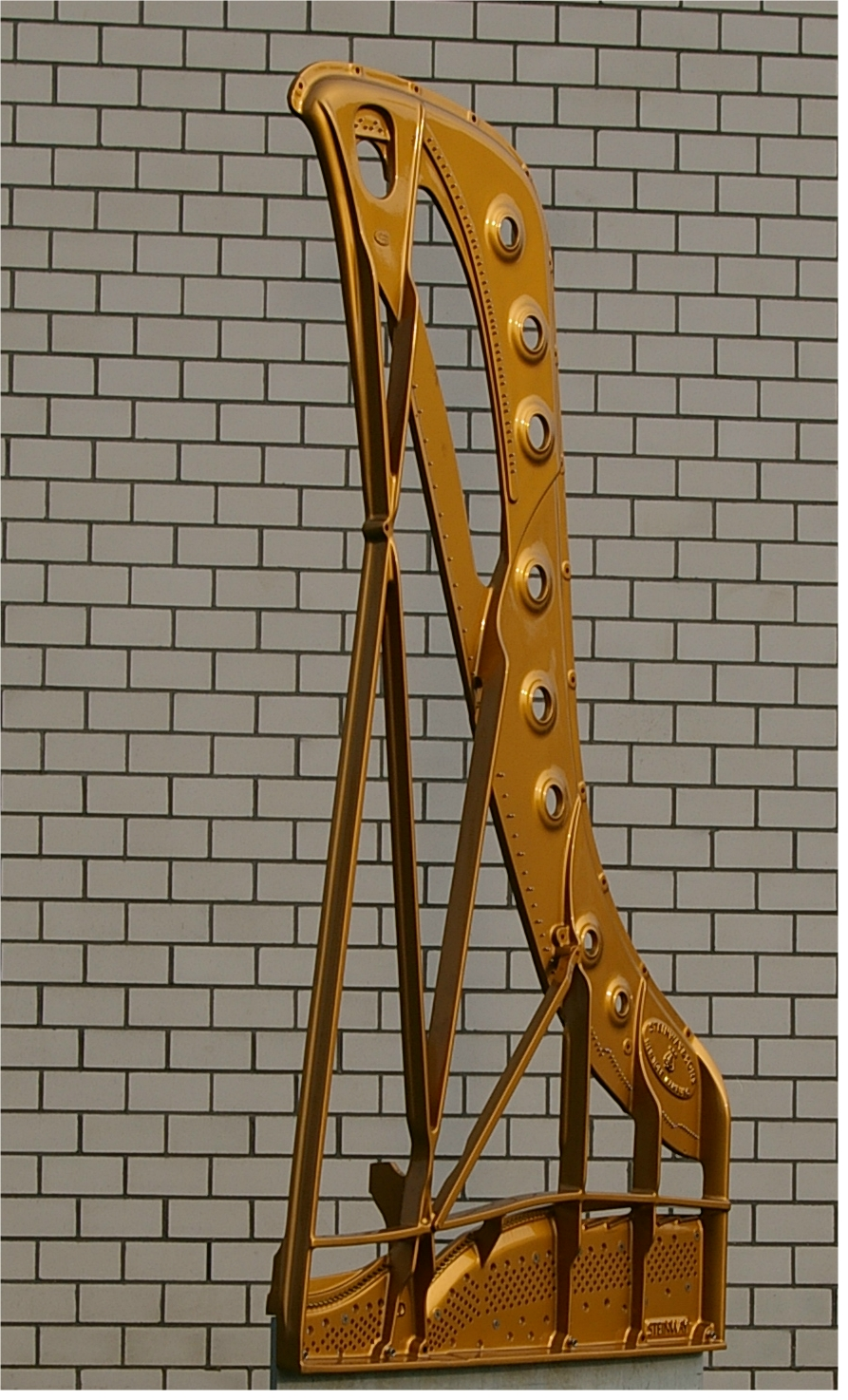
Cast iron "harp" of a grand piano

The earliest known cast-iron remains in Luhe County, China date to approximately the 8th century BC, although some of the earliest fragments may have been produced accidentally as cast iron and wrought iron can be produced unintentionally when smelting copper using iron ore as a flux. Cast-iron production became widespread in China by about the 5th century BC.

Cast iron can be poured into a mold to create complex shapes that would be difficult or impossible to make with other traditional metalworking techniques. However, because cast iron is comparatively brittle, it is not suitable for purposes where a sharp edge or flexibility is required. It is strong under compression, but not under tension. Although wrought iron or steel was more desirable, cast iron was cheaper and thus was more commonly used for implements other than weapons in ancient China. The Chinese developed a method of annealing cast iron by keeping hot castings in an oxidizing atmosphere for a week or longer in order to burn off some carbon near the surface in order to keep the surface layer from being too brittle.

Compared to bloomery iron, China's development of the blast furnace significantly increased iron production capacity. Combined with subsequent decarburization and Fining processes, this enabled mass production for implements such as agricultural tools in cast iron, while decarburization processes such as fining converted cast iron into wrought iron which was were preferred for weapons.

Whether the European blast furnaces that appeared in Sweden, Germany, and Italy in the 12th and 13th centuries developed independently or ultimately derived from earlier Chinese technology remains uncertain. Both possibilities have been proposed, but direct evidence demonstrating transmission across Eurasia is lacking.

In 1707, Abraham Darby patented a new method of making pots (and kettles) thinner and hence cheaper than those made by traditional methods. This meant that his Coalbrookdale furnaces became dominant as suppliers of pots, an activity in which they were joined in the 1720s and 1730s by a small number of other coke-fired blast furnaces.

Application of the steam engine to power blast bellows (indirectly by pumping water to a waterwheel) in Britain, beginning in 1743 and increasing in the 1750s, was a key factor in increasing the production of cast iron, which surged in the following decades. In addition to overcoming the limitation on water power, the steam-pumped-water powered blast gave higher furnace temperatures which allowed the use of higher lime ratios, enabling the conversion from charcoal (supplies of wood for which were inadequate) to coke.

The ironmasters of the Weald continued producing cast irons until the 1760s, and armament was one of the main uses of irons after the Restoration.

=== Cast-iron bridges ===
The use of cast iron for structural purposes began in the late 1770s, when Abraham Darby III built The Iron Bridge, although short beams had already been used, such as in the blast furnaces at Coalbrookdale. Other inventions followed, including one patented by Thomas Paine. Cast-iron bridges became commonplace as the Industrial Revolution gathered pace. Thomas Telford adopted the material for his bridge upstream at Buildwas, and then for Longdon-on-Tern Aqueduct, a canal trough aqueduct at Longdon-on-Tern on the Shrewsbury Canal. It was followed by the Chirk Aqueduct and the Pontcysyllte Aqueduct, both of which remain in use following the recent restorations.

The best way of using cast iron for bridge construction was by using arches, so that all the material is in compression. Cast iron, again like masonry, is very strong in compression. Wrought iron, like most other kinds of iron and indeed like most metals in general, is strong in tension, and also tough – resistant to fracturing. The relationship between wrought iron and cast iron, for structural purposes, may be thought of as analogous to the relationship between wood and stone.

Cast-iron beam bridges were used widely by the early railways, such as the Water Street Bridge in 1830 at the Manchester terminus of the Liverpool and Manchester Railway, but problems with its use became all too apparent when a new bridge carrying the Chester and Holyhead Railway across the River Dee in Chester collapsed killing five people in May 1847, less than a year after it was opened. The Dee bridge disaster was caused by excessive loading at the centre of the beam by a passing train, and many similar bridges had to be demolished and rebuilt, often in wrought iron. The bridge had been badly designed, being trussed with wrought iron straps, which were wrongly thought to reinforce the structure. The centres of the beams were put into bending, with the lower edge in tension, where cast iron, like masonry, is very weak.

Nevertheless, cast iron continued to be used in inappropriate structural ways, until the Tay Rail Bridge disaster of 1879 cast serious doubt on the use of the material. Crucial lugs for holding tie bars and struts in the Tay Bridge had been cast integral with the columns, and they failed in the early stages of the accident. In addition, the bolt holes were also cast and not drilled. Thus, because of casting's draft angle, the tension from the tie bars was placed on the hole's edge rather than being spread over the length of the hole. The replacement bridge was built in wrought iron and steel.

Further bridge collapses occurred, however, culminating in the Norwood Junction rail accident of 1891. Thousands of cast-iron rail underbridges were eventually replaced by steel equivalents by 1900 owing to the widespread concern about cast iron under bridges on the rail network in Britain.

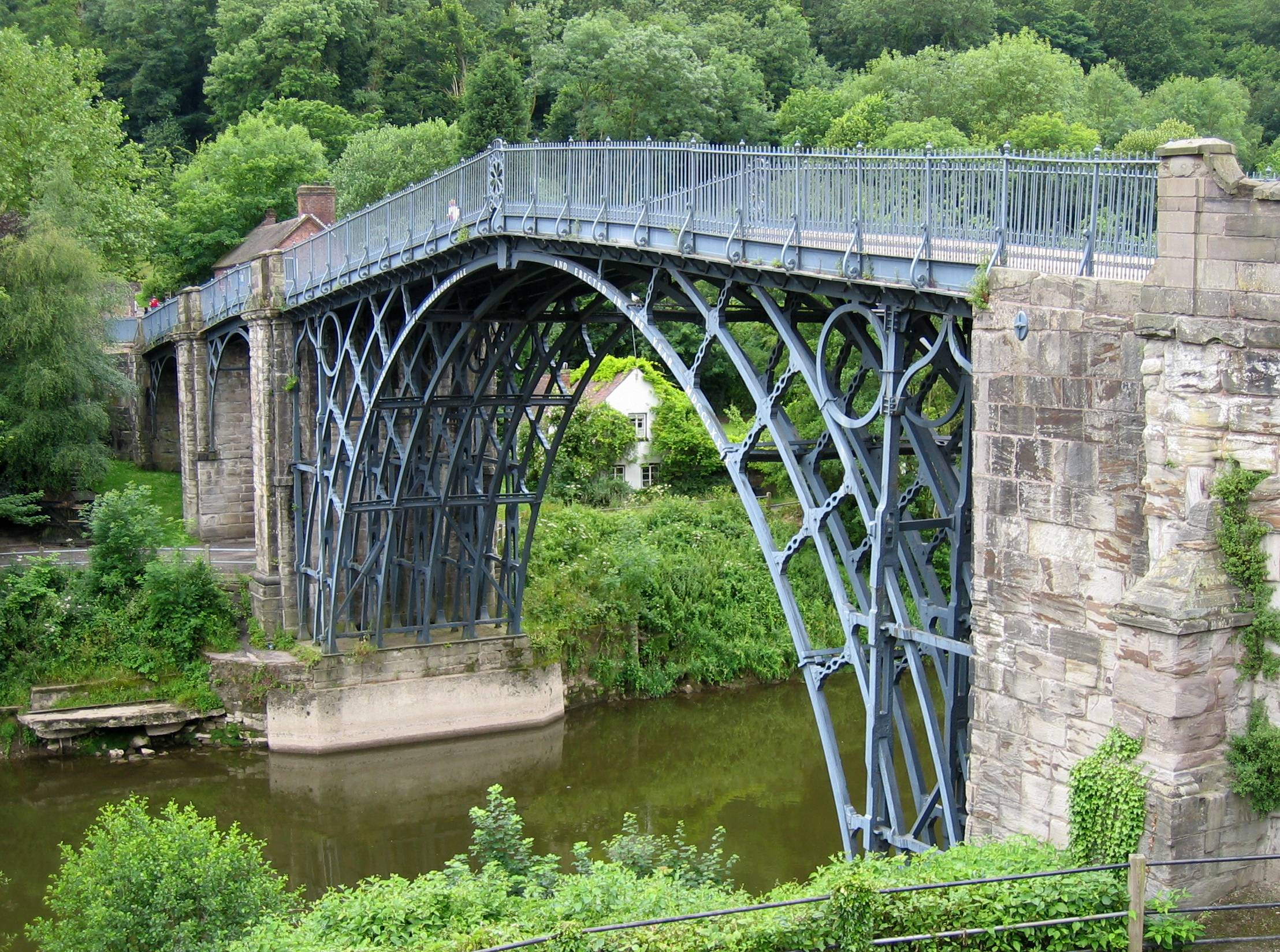
The Iron Bridge over the River Severn at Coalbrookdale, England (finished 1779)

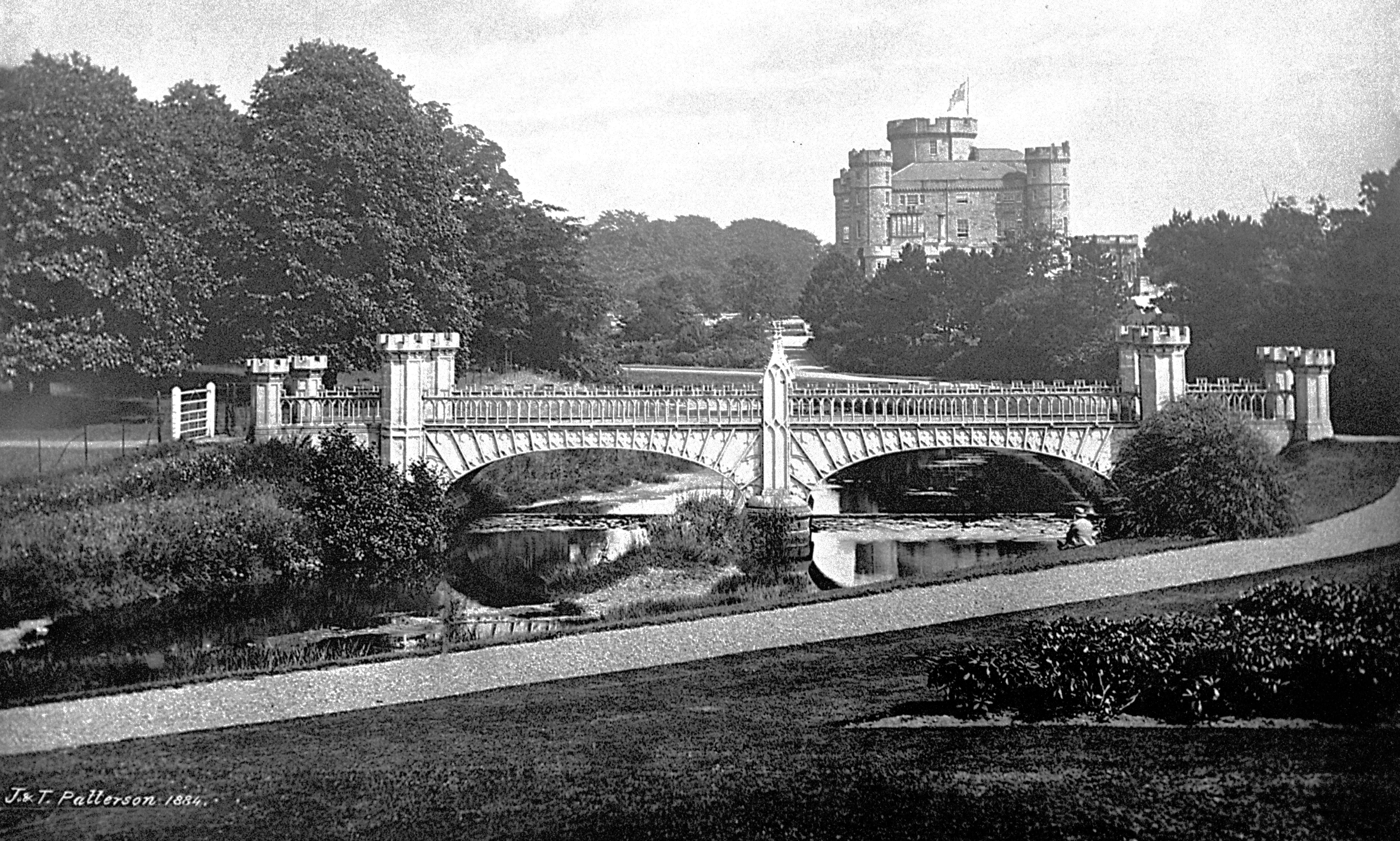
The Eglinton Tournament Bridge (completed c1845), North Ayrshire, Scotland, built from cast iron

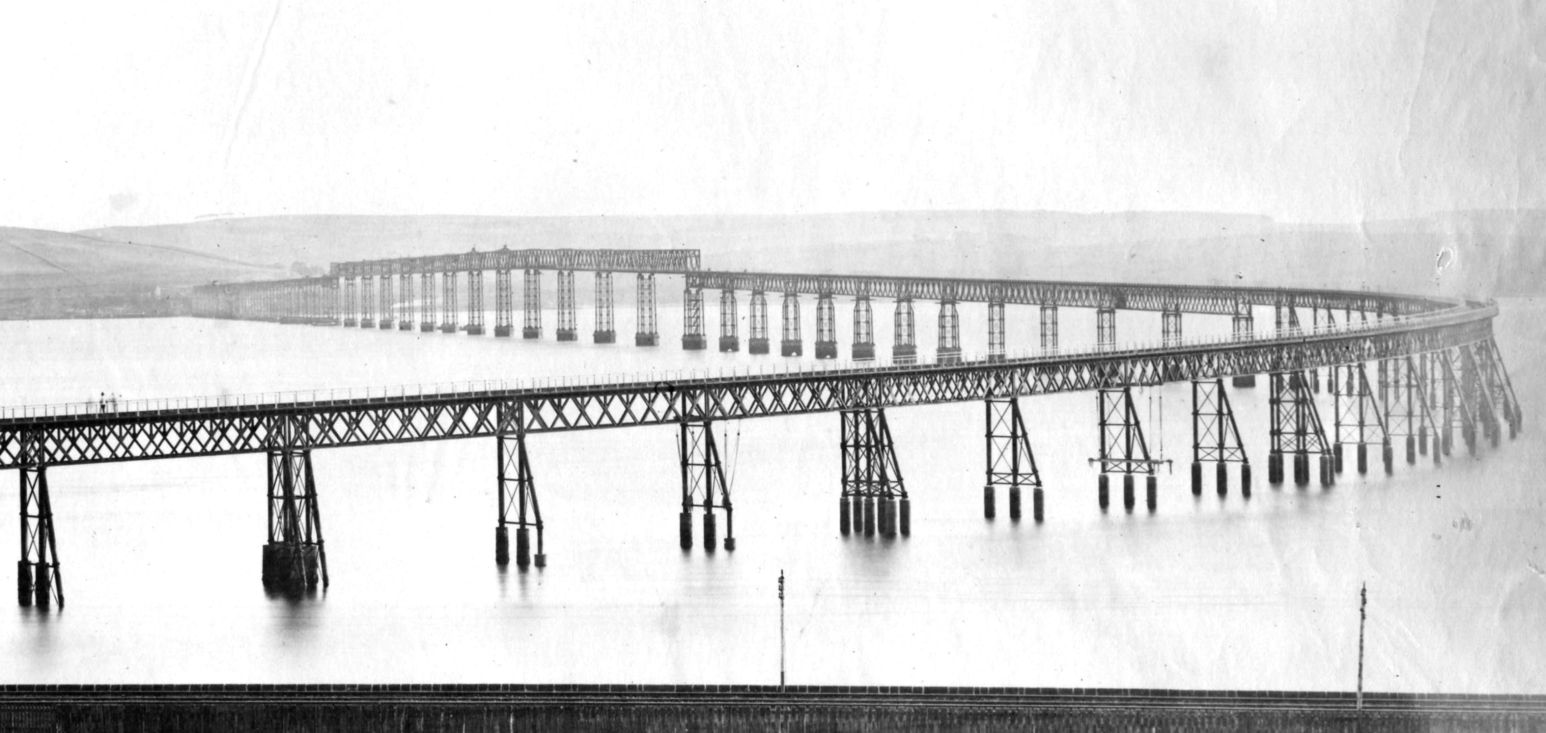
Original Tay Bridge from the north (finished 1878)

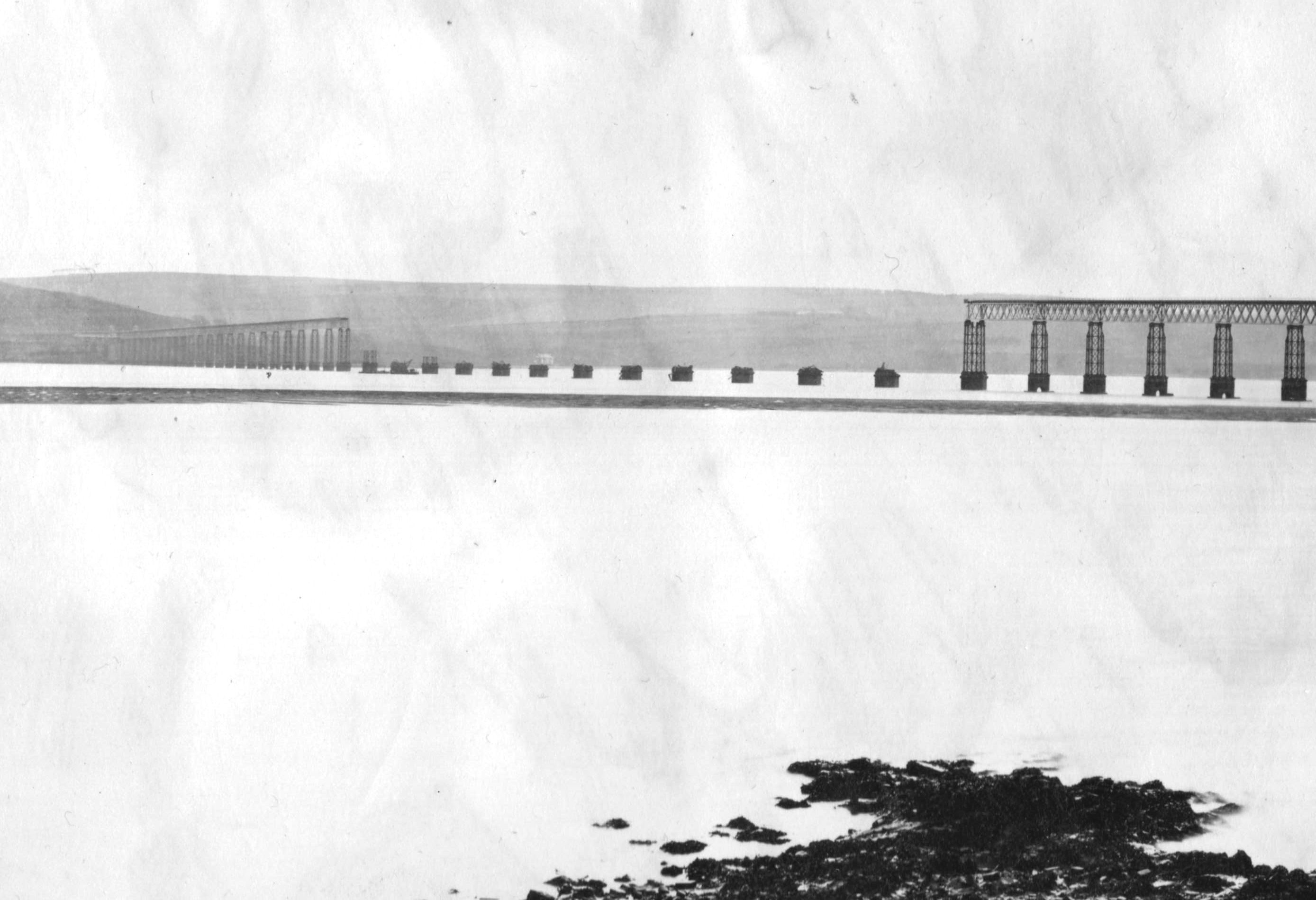
Fallen Tay Bridge from the north

=== Buildings ===
Cast-iron columns, pioneered in mill buildings, enabled architects to build multi-storey buildings without the enormously thick walls required for masonry buildings of any height. They also opened up floor spaces in factories, and sight lines in churches and auditoriums. By the mid 19th century, cast iron columns were common in warehouse and industrial buildings, combined with wrought or cast iron beams, eventually leading to the development of steel-framed skyscrapers. Cast iron was also used sometimes for decorative facades, especially in the United States, and the Soho district of New York has numerous examples. It was also used occasionally for complete prefabricated buildings, such as the historic Iron Building in Watervliet, New York.

=== Textile mills ===
Another important use was in textile mills. The air in the mills contained flammable fibres from the cotton, hemp, or wool being spun. As a result, textile mills had an alarming propensity to burn down. The solution was to build them completely of non-combustible materials, and it was found convenient to provide the building with an iron frame, largely of cast iron, replacing flammable wood. The first such building was at Ditherington in Shrewsbury, Shropshire. Many other warehouses were built using cast-iron columns and beams, although faulty designs, flawed beams or overloading sometimes caused building collapses and structural failures.

During the Industrial Revolution, cast iron was also widely used for frame and other fixed parts of machinery, including spinning and later weaving machines in textile mills. Cast iron became widely used, and many towns had foundries producing industrial and agricultural machinery.

== See also ==
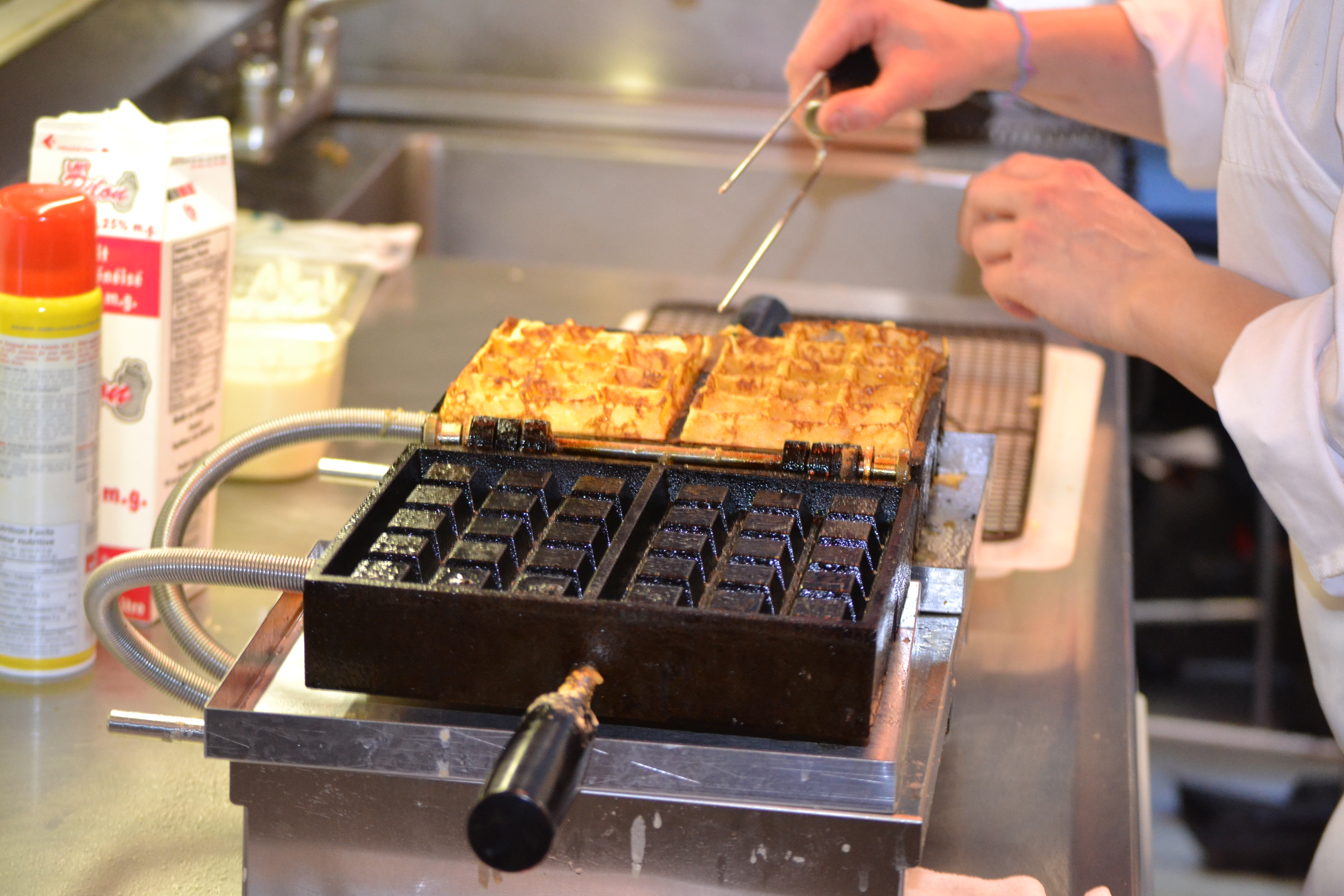
Cast-iron waffle iron, an example of cast-iron cookware

- Ironwork – artisan metalwork (for architectural elements, garden features, and ornamental objects)
- Ironworks – a place where iron is worked (including historical sites)
- Meehanite
- Sand casting
- Cast-iron cookware
