= Milacron =

American plastics company

Milacron, LLC
- Company type: Public
- Industry: Plastics
- Predecessor: Cincinnati Milling Machine Company
- Founded: Cincinnati, Ohio (1970)
- Headquarters: Batavia, Ohio, United States of America
- Products: Plastics processing equipment for injection molding and extrusion Auxiliary equipment IIoT solutions
- Number of employees: 5,600 (2019)
- Website: milacron.com

Milacron, LLC, is an American limited liability company that manufactures and distributes plastic processing equipment for fields such as injection molding and extrusion molding. Milacron is one of many operating companies that make up Hillenbrand, Inc. Hillenbrand acquired Milacron in November 2019.

== History ==
Reincorporated in 1970 from the Cincinnati Milling Machine Company, Milacron has grown over the years. With the acquisition of - the Extruderbuilding companies Anger AGM Linz and Anger APM Vienna (Austria) in 1969.

Together with the existing Injection Molding Machines production, it was the basis for "50 years in plastic".

- Ferromatik in 1993, DME (Detroit Mold Engineering) in 1996, and Industrial Machine Sales, Inc. (IMSI) along with its sister company Precise Plastics Machinery (PPM) in 2014.

In 2009, Milacron filed for Chapter 11 bankruptcy protection and was sold to a group of investors.

Bain Capital acquired a 51 percent stake in the company in February 2025.

== Brand Names ==
The following are brands of Milacron:

- Ferromatik
- Canterbury
- Genca

=== Heritage Brands ===
- Cincinnati Milacron
- Servtek
- Wear Technology
