= Gray iron =

Alloy of iron and carbon

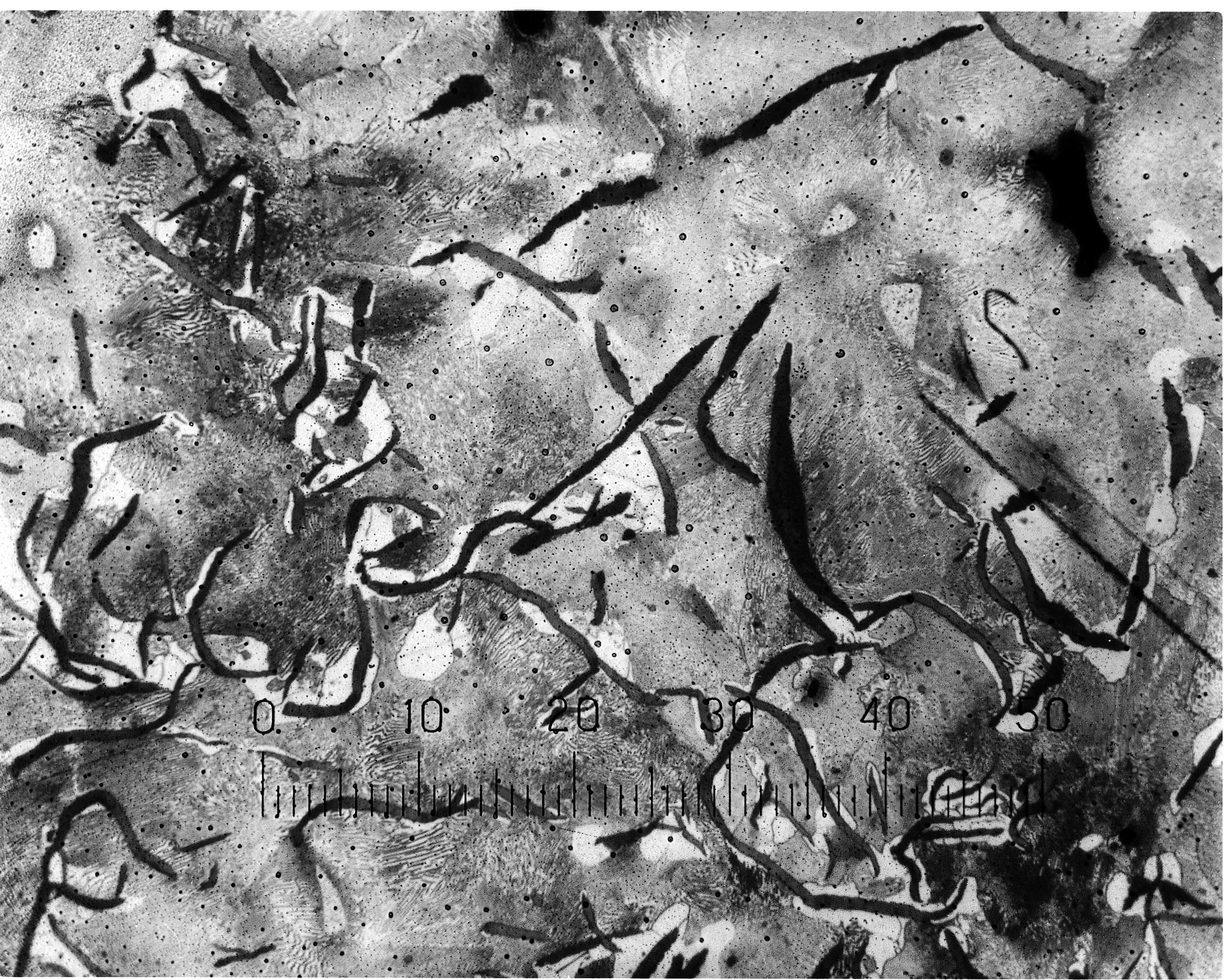
Micrograph of grey cast iron (Picture taken by Ben Hinks)

Gray iron, or grey cast iron, is a type of cast iron that has a graphitic microstructure. It is named after the gray color of the fracture it forms, which is due to the presence of graphite. It is the most common cast iron and the most widely used cast material based on weight.

It is used for housings where the stiffness of the component is more important than its tensile strength, such as internal combustion engine cylinder blocks, pump housings, valve bodies, electrical boxes, and decorative castings. Grey cast iron's high thermal conductivity and specific heat capacity are often exploited to make cast iron cookware and disc brake rotors.

Its former widespread use on brakes in freight trains has been greatly reduced in the European Union over concerns regarding noise pollution. Deutsche Bahn for example had replaced grey iron brakes on 53,000 of its freight cars (85% of their fleet) with newer, quieter models by 2019—in part to comply with a law that came into force in December 2022.

== Structure ==
A typical chemical composition to obtain a graphitic microstructure is 2.5 to 4.7% carbon and 1 to 8% silicon by weight. Graphite may occupy 6 to 10% of the volume of grey iron. Silicon is important for making grey iron as opposed to white cast iron, because silicon is a graphite stabilizing element in cast iron, which means it helps the alloy produce graphite instead of iron carbides; at 3% silicon almost no carbon is held in chemical form as iron carbide. Another factor affecting graphitization is the solidification rate; the slower the rate, the greater the time for the carbon to diffuse and accumulate into graphite. A moderate cooling rate forms a more pearlitic matrix, while a fast cooling rate forms a more ferritic matrix. To achieve a fully ferritic matrix the alloy must be annealed. Rapid cooling partly or completely suppresses graphitization and leads to the formation of cementite, which is called white iron.

The graphite takes on the shape of a three-dimensional flake. In two dimensions, as a polished surface, the graphite flakes appear as fine lines. The graphite has no appreciable strength, so they can be treated as voids. The tips of the flakes act as preexisting notches at which stresses concentrate and it therefore behaves in a brittle manner. The presence of graphite flakes makes the grey iron easily machinable as they tend to crack easily across the graphite flakes. Grey iron also has very good damping capacity and hence it is often used as the base for machine tool mountings.

== Classifications ==
In the United States, the most commonly used classification for gray iron is ASTM International standard A48. This orders gray iron into classes which correspond with its minimum tensile strength in thousands of pounds per square inch (ksi); e.g. class 20 gray iron has a minimum tensile strength of 20,000 psi (140 MPa). Class 20 has a high carbon equivalent and a ferrite matrix. Higher strength gray irons, up to class 40, have lower carbon equivalents and a pearlite matrix. Gray iron above class 40 requires alloying to provide solid solution strengthening, and heat treating is used to modify the matrix. Class 80 is the highest class available, but it is extremely brittle. ASTM A247 is also commonly used to describe the graphite structure. Other ASTM standards that deal with gray iron include ASTM A126, ASTM A278, and ASTM A319.

In the automotive industry, the SAE International (SAE) standard SAE J431 is used to designate grades instead of classes. These grades are a measure of the tensile strength-to-Brinell hardness ratio. The variation of the tensile modulus of elasticity of the various grades is a reflection of the percentage of graphite in the material as such material has neither strength nor stiffness and the space occupied by graphite acts like a void, thereby creating a spongy material.

Properties of ASTM A48 classes of gray iron
Class	Tensile strength (ksi)	Compressive strength (ksi)	Tensile modulus, E (Mpsi)
20	22	83	10
30	31	109	14
40	57	140	18
60	62.5	187.5	21

Properties of SAE J431 grades of gray iron
Grade	Brinell hardness	t/h^{†}	Description
G1800	120–187	135	Ferritic-pearlitic
G2500	170–229	135	Pearlitic-ferritic
G3000	187–246	150	Pearlitic
G3500	207–255	165	Pearlitic
G4000	217–269	175	Pearlitic
^{†}t/h = tensile strength/hardness

== Advantages and disadvantages ==
Gray iron is a common engineering alloy because of its relatively low cost and good machinability, which results from the graphite lubricating the cut and breaking up the chips. It also has good galling and wear resistance because the graphite flakes self-lubricate. The graphite also gives gray iron an excellent damping capacity because it absorbs the energy and converts it into heat. Grey iron cannot be worked (forged, extruded, rolled etc.) even at temperature.

Relative damping capacity of various metals
Materials	Damping capacity^{†}
Gray iron (high carbon equivalent)	100–500
Gray iron (low carbon equivalent)	20–100
Ductile iron	5–20
Malleable iron	8–15
White iron	2–4
Steel	4
Aluminum	0.47
^{†}Natural log of the ratio of successive amplitudes

Gray iron also experiences less solidification shrinkage than other cast irons that do not form a graphite microstructure. The silicon promotes good corrosion resistance and increased fluidity when casting. Gray iron is generally considered easy to weld. Compared to the more modern iron alloys, gray iron has a low tensile strength and ductility; therefore, its impact and shock resistance is almost non-existent.

== See also ==
- Meehanite
