= Cincinnati Milling Machine Company =

American machine tool builder

- Industry: Machine tool
- Founded: 1889
- Defunct: 1970
- Fate: Reincorporated
- Successor: Milacron
- Headquarters: Cincinnati, Ohio, United States
- Subsidiaries: Foundry Products Operations

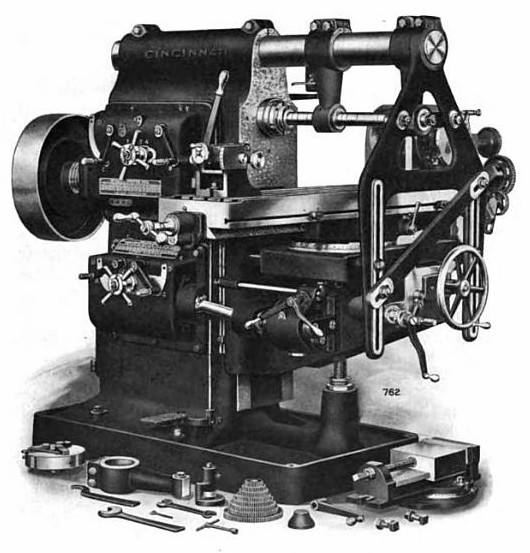
A typical milling machine of the era, built by Cincinnati Milling Machine Company. It is a horizontal, with an overarm for the arbor.

The Cincinnati Milling Machine Company was an American machine tool builder headquartered in Cincinnati, Ohio. Incorporated in 1889, the company was formed for the purpose of building and promoting innovative new machine tool designs, especially milling machines. The principals in forming the company were Frederick A. Geier and Fred Holz. It was formed from the Cincinnati Screw and Tap Co., a partnership of George Mueller and Fred Holz, that became successful building machine tools.

From the 1890s through the 1960s, the Cincinnati Milling Machine Company was one of the biggest builders of milling machines. The company became the US's largest machine tool builder by 1926. It also built various other classes of machines, such as planers and grinding machines. In 1970, it was reincorporated as Cincinnati Milacron Inc. and later as Milacron Inc. The machine tool business line was later sold to Unova, and portions operated as Cincinnati Machine Company. An Indian subsidiary, Cincinnati Milacron Ltd, is now called Ferromatik Milacron India Pvt Ltd.

== See also ==
- Foundry Products Operations

== Bibliography ==
- Cincinnati Milling Machine Company (1916), A treatise on milling and milling machines, Cincinnati, Ohio, US: Cincinnati Milling Machine Company.
