= Damping capacity =

Mechanical property of materials

Damping capacity

Damping capacity is a mechanical property of materials that measure a material's ability to dissipate elastic strain energy during mechanical vibration or wave propagation. When ranked according to damping capacity, materials may be roughly categorized as either high- or low-damping. Low damping materials may be utilized in musical instruments where sustained mechanical vibration and acoustic wave propagation is desired. Conversely, high-damping materials are valuable in suppressing vibration for the control of noise and for the stability of sensitive systems and instruments.

== Overview ==
A large damping capacity is desirable for materials used in structures where unwanted vibrations are induced during operation such as machine tool bases or crankshafts. Materials like brass and steel have small damping capacities allowing vibration energy to be transmitted through them without attenuation. An example of a material with a large damping capacity is gray cast iron.

An understanding of this effect can be gained from observation of a stress-strain diagram with exaggerated features. The units of stress are force per unit area, while strain has units of length per length. Any area covered by integrating each instant of a loading and unloading cycle will then be in terms of force times length per volume, which is equivalent to energy per unit volume. This energy represents the amount of mechanical energy being converted to heat in a volume of material resulting in damping.
