= Meehanite =

Cast iron production process

Meehanite is a trademark for an engineering process to make a range of cast irons produced under specific and carefully controlled conditions to precise internationally recognized specifications. According to the Meehanite Worldwide company, when correctly followed the Meehanite process will produce cast iron with uniform soundness, consistent physical and mechanical properties and dependable performance in service.

When a foundry advertises that it produces "Meehanite" it means that the foundry is licensed by Meehanite Metal Corporation to produce the family of Meehanite irons. The licensing agreement means, according to Meehanite, not only that the foundry is qualified but also that the licensed foundry is certified by audit to meet the required process standards.

The Trademark name is owned by Meehanite Worldwide. Meehanite Worldwide has five franchises: The Meehanite Metal Corp located in Mequon, Wisconsin; The International Meehanite Metal Corp located in Finland; and franchises in Taiwan, South Africa, and Japan.

The Meehanite specifications can be classified into three broad types: High duty flake or gray irons; high duty “nodular” or ductile iron (SG); and a group consisting of special types for applications requiring resistance to heat, wear and corrosion.

Castings made by this method are used extensively to make machine tools, gears, sheaves, cylinder heads, valve bodies, rollers and other highly engineered applications.

== History ==
The Meehanite process was developed in the late 1920s and early 1930s, by the Ross Meehan foundry in Chattanooga, Tennessee. This initial discovery was based around the use of calcium silicide to inoculate irons melted in a controlled manner. This resulted in the development of cast irons of greater strength suitable for critical engineering applications.

“The Meehanite Metal Corp” was led by Oliver Smalley to license the processes to foundries. Many other patented casting processes were also established. The company was successfully operated as such until the middle 1950s when the corporation was acquired by Harry Kessler. Harry Kessler was a St. Louis foundry entrepreneur who owned a competing process (Sorbomat) company. In 1987 the corporation was acquired by Finnish Foundry Group, now the Association of Finnish Foundry Product Industries.

== Relevant patents ==
U.S. patent 1,790,552, issued to Augustus F. Meehan in January 1931, is the initial patent on the process. This patent concerned a technique to make "grey iron castings" (note: this is the spelling exactly as it appears in the patent).

The Meehanite Metal Corporation has a number of other patents on machinery for adding the inoculant agents to melts of iron in a controlled manner.
