= Resolution (beam engine) =

Coordinates: 52.641°N 2.4896°W

Origins
- Type: Atmospheric beam engine
- Designer: James Watt
- Maker: Boulton and Watt
- Date: 1781
- Country of origin: England
- Former operator: Coalbrookdale Company
- Purpose: Water-returning engine driving machinery

Measurements
- Cylinders: 1
- Bore: 67 inches (170 cm)

Preservation
- Working: No

Resolution was an early beam engine, installed between 1781 and 1782 at Coalbrookdale as a water-returning engine to power the blast furnaces and ironworks there. It was one of the last water-returning engines to be constructed, before the rotative beam engine made this type of engine obsolete.

== Water power in Coalbrookdale ==
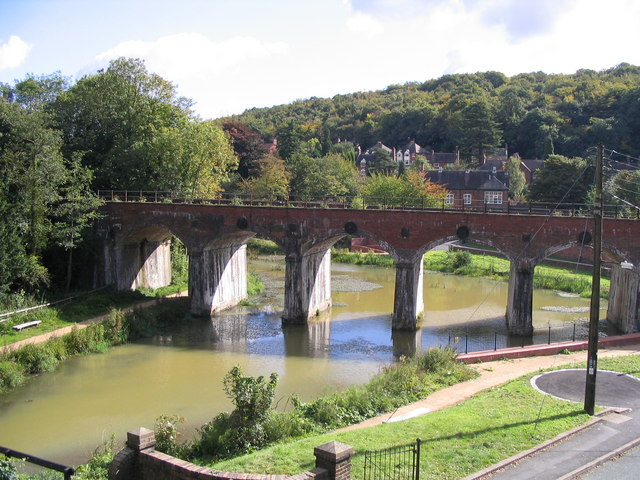
The Upper Furnace Pool at Coalbrookdale, supplied by Resolution

Coalbrookdale was a cradle of the First Industrial Revolution and was the scene of Abraham Darby's first production of iron by a coke-fired blast furnace, rather than the previous and expensive charcoal. Coalbrookdale is a narrow steep-sided valley that offered useful water power to drive the furnace blast and the various stamp mills, boring engines, etc. Contemporary visitors commented upon the picturesque 'fine cascades' of water. Although the water power available at Coalbrookdale had been described as 'abundant', it was also seasonal: in the summer months, the lack of water could require the furnace to be 'blown out' for some months and work suspended.

A simple method to extend the water availability was to construct a series of ponds high in the valley. These provided a reserve of water to cover short periods of low rainfall, but could not supply an entire summer.

From 1735, the Coalbrookdale Company under Abraham Darby II attempted to reduce their dependency upon seasonal water supply by a series of water-returning engines. These engines did not drive the ironworks machinery directly, but pumped water from the lower to upper ponds to recycle it. The first of these engines was horse-worked in around 1735, then replaced by a Newcomen engine in 1742–1743. Newcomen engines were recognised as expensive in their coal consumption and were replaced in most situations other than coal mines, where waste slack could be used. At Coalbrookdale, the steam engines were fired with high quality coal, possibly the same grade of metallurgical coal as used in the blast furnaces. (Note: Darby found that of the local coal seams, only the low-sulphur 'Clod Coal' seam was suitable for smelting.) This continued until the recession of 1830, when Abraham IV and Alfred Darby saved 600 tons of high quality coal by switching the works to using only low-quality coal for boilers.

To increase the water pumping capacity, and to reduce the amount of coal consumed, in 1781 Abraham Darby III replaced the existing Newcomen engine with Resolution, one of the recently developed, and more efficient, atmospheric engines with Watt's separate condenser.

== Construction ==
External image
- Near View of the Resolution Steam-Engine, Coalbrookdale, Philip James De Loutherbourg

The engine was built by the partnership of Boulton and Watt. The cylinder was 67 inches in diameter: large for its day, but not exceptional. This cylinder was single-acting and worked on Newcomen's atmospheric principle, although improved by Watt's separate condenser. Its boiler was of Watt's wagon style and was 22 feet in diameter. The beam was wooden, but as the engine was so large it was made from multiple laminated timbers, as was becoming common around this time for the increasingly large and powerful engines. At each end it was fitted with an iron-shod wooden arch head, with the engine's force transmitted by a pair of chains.

The beam is of an amazing strength being compos’d of 8 large oak trees, …which is supported by a strong cast Metal Gudgeon or pivot…

—

The water pump had two cylinders of 26-inch diameter.

"discharge 315 Gallons of water each stroke & which is at the rate of 2235 Gallons Pr minute, & perhaps one of the largest Engines ever erected, its daily consumption of Coal reckoning 24 hours to the day is 200 hundred weight."

—

The name Resolution was a reference to Captain Cook's recent South Seas voyages aboard HMS Resolution.

Resolution was outdated in some ways shortly after it was delivered. In 1782, Watt developed a further two of his major innovations in the steam engine: double-acting engines and the rotative beam engine. Despite this, single-acting non-rotative beam engines would remain in use for pumping water from mines for more than another century.

== Site ==
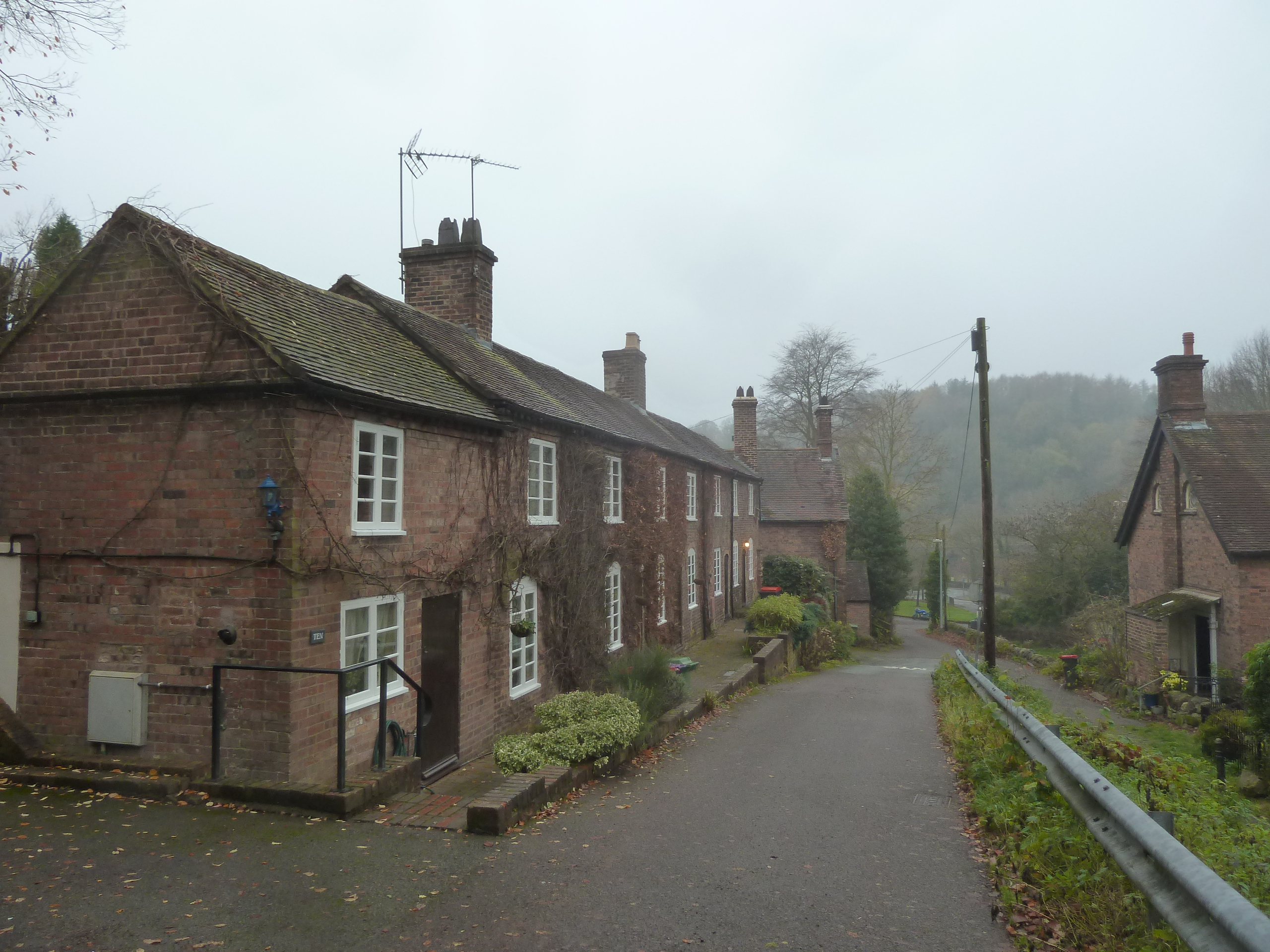
'Engine Row' cottages (left), the approximate site of Resolution was behind these

Resolution was installed at the head of Coalbrookdale, between the header ponds of the Upper Furnace Pool and the New Pool. This site was further up the valley than that of the preceding Newcomen engine, which had been sited at what is now the large Wesleyan chapel on the main road. The older engine had supplied the Lower Furnace Pool. The New Pool was constructed long before, around 1698, but only acted as an additional reservoir to the Upper Furnace Pool and did not supply any waterwheels or equipment directly. There was thus no advantage in pumping water back to its extra height and so Resolution supplied the Upper Furnace Pool, although by a short mill-race that also supplied a corn-mill.

Pumping engines of this vintage used a vertical pump rod, with a bucket pump at the bottom of the shaft. This could lift water from an appreciable depth, developed for the needs of Cornish tin mining, but they had only low delivery pressure at the top of the shaft. The engine was thus placed near to where the water was to be delivered, rather than its source.

The source of the returned water was one of the lower ponds, the Boring Mill Pool. This was enlarged to provide a greater reservoir capacity, around the time this engine was installed. From here an underground passageway was dug, 0.8 km long to the engine house pump. Although this was heading up the dale, the passage had a slight fall to the North, to encourage the water flow. At the pump shaft, the shaft was now 120 feet (37 m) deep. This tunnel was just one of a number of culverts, sluices and similar works built at the Coalbrookdale site around this time.

External image
- Watercolour when partially derelict, by J Homes Smith

The engine had a working life of just less than forty years. By 1821 the engine house was painted as being in a semi-demolished state.

== In art ==
The working engine was sketched by the artist Philip James de Loutherbourg, in either 1786 or 1800.

The engine's demolition, and the end of its service, can be dated to 1821, when it was painted by J Homes Smith.
