= Bellers =

Bellers is a surname. Notable people with the surname include:

- Fettiplace Bellers (1687-c. 1742), English dramatist and philosophical writer
- John Bellers (1654–1725), English educational theorist and Quaker
- William Bellers (fl. 1749–1773), English landscape painter

== See also ==
- Beller, another surname
