= Arthur Raistrick =

British geologist and archaeologist (1896–1991)

Arthur Raistrick (16 August 1896 – 9 April 1991) was a British geologist, archaeologist, academic, and writer. He was born in a working class home in Saltaire, Yorkshire. He was a scholar in many related, and some unrelated, fields. He published some 330 articles, books, pamphlets and scholarly treatises.

== Early life and work ==
In his early life he was imprisoned as a conscientious objector to military service in the First World War. During his confines in Durham and Wormwood Scrubs prisons he began an association with, and later membership of, the Society of Friends, that lasted throughout his life. As well as a pacifist, he was a socialist and had close ties to the early Independent Labour Party, which he greatly valued into his old age.

His interests ranged widely. His early academic life was spent at Armstrong and Kings Colleges, Newcastle part of Durham University (later to become Newcastle University) where he attained the role of Reader in Applied Geology. His academic writings start from this period of his life, in 1925.

After work in mine safety, he once again settled into an academic life. His interests widened from geology and mining engineering into what would now be termed landscape studies. At the same time, his interest in mechanical engineering led him to carry out pioneering work on the lead mining industry of his native Yorkshire and elsewhere, including Two centuries of Industrial Welfare (on the London Lead Company).

Again refusing directed labour for war in 1941, Arthur Raistrick was forced to leave his academic post in Newcastle. He stated that King's College "just had to suspend me", without pay. During the war years, he refused to earn sufficient money to pay income tax which would fund the war effort and he spent much of the time in converting a one-time barn into a home for himself and his wife, Sarah Elizabeth (née Chapman). It was during this period that he wrote the popular handbook Teach Yourself Geology (1943).

As a Friend, Arthur Raistrick became interested in the history of Quaker involvement in science and industry, leading him to publish widely on this subject. In the course of this, he was responsible, with others, for pioneering work on the industrial archaeology of the Coalbrookdale area. His Dynasty of Ironfounders remains a seminal work on the Darbys of Coalbrookdale and their work in the cradle of the industrial revolution.

As a tribute to his accomplishments, the Yorkshire Dales Society named him the Dalesman of the Millennium.

== An industrial archaeologist ==
Raistrick was also a field archaeologist of some renown, specialising in the Craven area of the Yorkshire Dales, around his long-time home at Linton, near Grassington. His work in the field of industrial archaeology occupied much of his mature years. He published an early work on the subject, Industrial Archaeology which remains in use in undergraduate courses to this day.

As well as his master's degree and doctorate, Arthur Raistrick received Honorary Doctorates from the Universities of Leeds and Bradford. He was particularly associated with the latter university and bequeathed his extensive mineral collection to it, together with an unrivalled collection of closely annotated maps of the Yorkshire Dales and North Pennines, which form a commentary to his extensive fieldwork. Raistrick worked closely with the Craven Museum & Gallery donated many finds from his excavations to the museum and in 1969 was chair of the Friends of the Craven Museum group. He also left the bulk of his large library to Bradford University.

== Outdoor interests ==
Among other lifelong interests Raistrick was a keen walker, venturing far and wide amongst his beloved Yorkshire Dales and moors. He was a founder member of the Holiday Fellowship, a president of the Ramblers Association and a one time vice-president of the Youth Hostels Association. His interest in landscape and its conservation led to him serving several terms upon the Yorkshire Dales National Park Authority.

== Honours refused ==
Offered an OBE by Prime Minister Harold Wilson, Raistrick wrote a letter declining the honour, which started, characteristically, "Dear Harold, I am deeply disappointed in you...".

== Selected bibliography ==
- Raistrick, Arthur (1943) Teach Yourself Geology. EUP.
- Raistrick, Arthur (1947). Malham and Malham Moor. Dalesman Publishing Company.
- Raistrick, Arthur (1950) Quakers in Science and Industry, [London], Bannisdale Press.
- Raistrick, Arthur (1968). The Pennine Dales. Eyre & Spottiswoode. ISBN 0-09-906400-6.
- Raistrick, Arthur (1970). West Riding of Yorkshire. Hodder & Stoughton. ISBN 0-340-02372-4.
- Raistrick, Arthur (1972) Industrial Archaeology: an historical survey, London, Eyre Methuen, ISBN 0-413-28050-0
- Raistrick, Arthur (1973) Lead Mining in the Mid-Pennines, Truro, D. Bradford Baron
- Raistrick, Arthur (1977) Two Centuries of Industrial Welfare; the London (Quaker) Lead Company, 1692–1905: the social policy and work of the 'Governor and Company for Smelting down Lead with Pit Coal and Sea Coal', mainly in Alston Moor and the Pennines, Rev. 2nd ed., Buxton : Moorland Publishing Co. [1st ed.: London : 'Journal of the Friends Historical Society', 1938], ISBN 0-903485-13-3
- Raistrick, Arthur (1989) Dynasty of Iron Founders: the Darbys and Coalbrookdale, 2nd rev. ed., Coalbrookdale : Sessions Book Trust/Ironbridge Gorge Museum Trust, ISBN 1-85072-058-4
