= Darby Houses =

English museum

Coordinates: 52.64139°N 2.49410°W

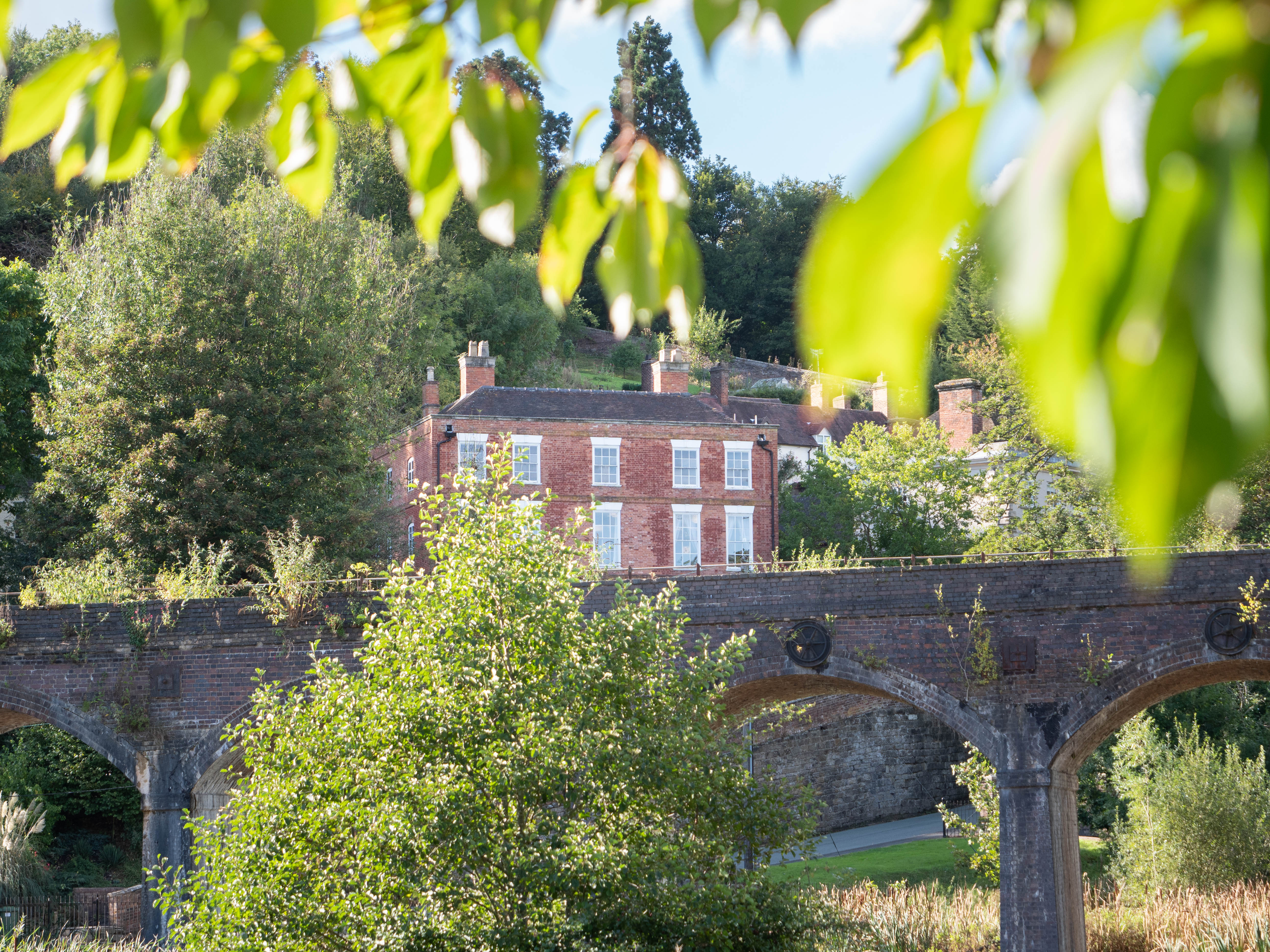
Dale House

The Darby Houses museum is managed by the National Trust and is one of ten museums acquired from the Ironbridge Gorge Museum Trust in 2026. It is based in Coalbrookdale in Ironbridge Gorge in Shropshire, England within a World Heritage Site, the birthplace of the Industrial Revolution.

The Darby Houses comprise the adjacent properties of Dale House and Rosehill, both of which were built for members of the Darby family in Darby Road, Coalbrookdale.

== Dale House ==
Dale House was originally built in 1717 for Abraham Darby I and looks out over the Upper Furnace Pool whose outflow powered the blast furnace. His son Abraham Darby II married Abiah Darby and they had several children. Abraham and Abiah moved to their new house, Sunniside, in 1750. Dale House was enlarged by subsequent generations: in 1776 Abraham Darby III converted the attic into a third floor. During the 20th century it was converted into flats, which undermined the true character of the house, but has since been restored as much as possible to its 18th-century appearance. It is a Grade II listed building.

== Rosehill ==
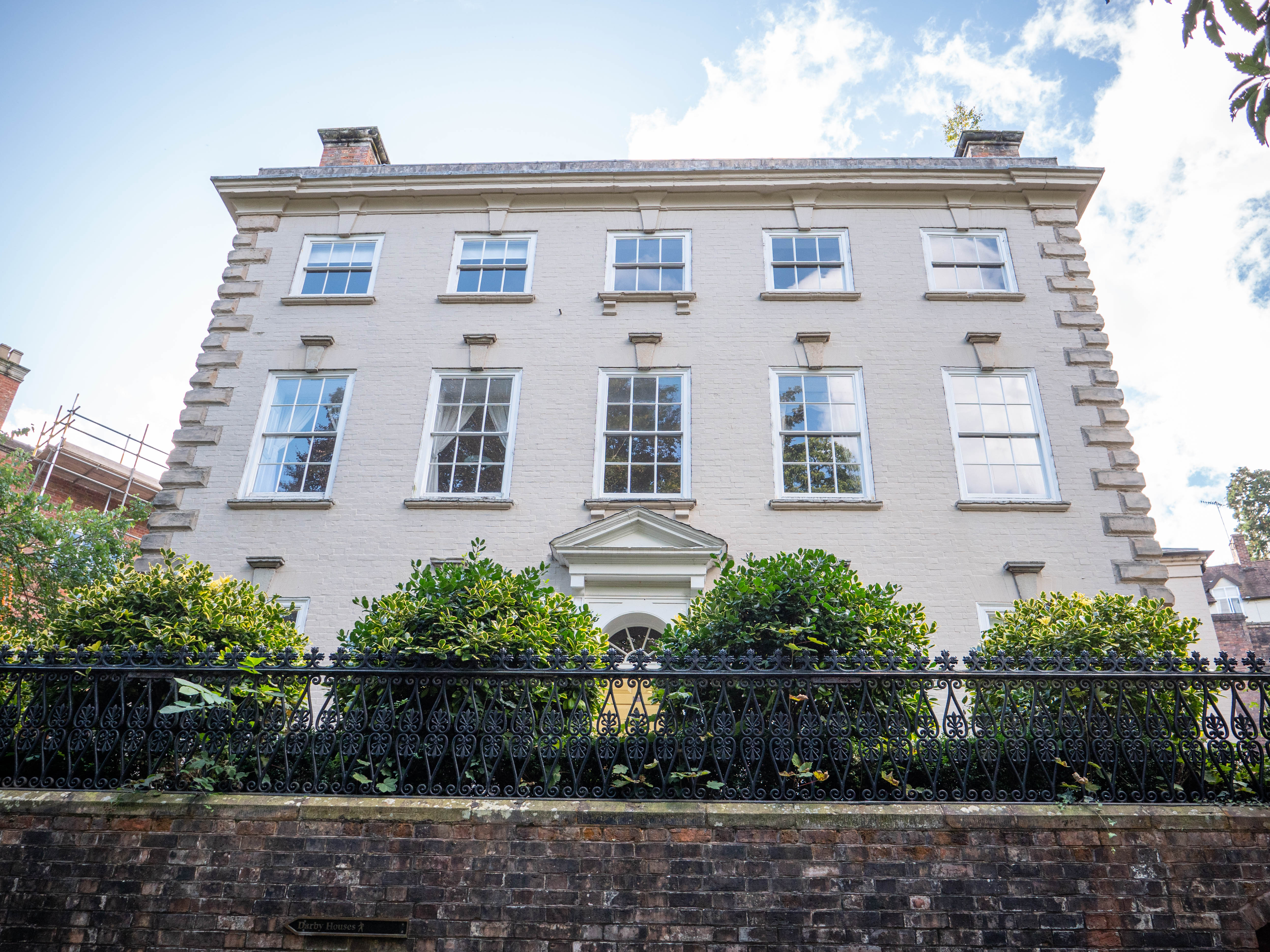
Rosehill House

Rosehill was built in about 1738 for Richard Ford, who married Abraham Darby I's eldest daughter, Mary. Richard was Clerk to the Coalbrookdale Company under Abraham I and later Manager of the Coalbrookdale Ironworks. In the mid 19th century the house was occupied by Abraham Darby III's youngest son Richard and his wife Maria and after his death by his daughter Rebecca until 1908. The house has been restored from an uninhabitable condition by architect Graham Winteringham and refurnished to recreate its 1850 appearance. Rosehill is also a Grade II listed building.
