= Abraham Darby =

Abraham Darby may refer to:

== People ==
- Abraham Darby I (1678–1717), English Quaker, developed a new method of producing pig iron with coke
- Abraham Darby II (1711–1763), his son, English Quaker industrialist
- Abraham Darby III (1750–1789), his son, built the world's first iron bridge at a place later known as Ironbridge
- Abraham Darby IV (1804–1878), his great nephew, High Sheriff of Buckinghamshire

== Other uses ==
- Rosa 'Abraham Darby', a rose cultivar
- Abraham Darby Specialist School for the Performing Arts, a school in Telford, England
