= Abiah Darby =

English Quaker minister (1716–1794)

Personal life
- Born: Abiah Maude; 1716 Sunderland, County Durham, England
- Died: 26 June 1794 (aged 77–78) Coalbrookdale, Shropshire, England
- Spouse: John Sinclair (m. 1734; died 1737); Abraham Darby II (m. 1746; died 1763)
- Children: 8, including: Abraham Darby III
- Other names: Abiah Sinclair; Tobiah Darby
- Occupation: Minister
- Relatives: Deborah Darby (daughter-in-law); Abraham Darby I (father-in-law)

Religious life
- Religion: Quaker

Abiah Darby (née Maude, formerly Sinclair; 1716 – 26 June 1794) was an English Quaker minister active in Coalbrookdale. The wife of the iron industrialist Abraham Darby, Darby kept a journal and she sent letters which recorded the Darby family's achievements. One of Darby letters has been used to identify the start of the Industrial Revolution.

== Life ==
Darby was born Abiah Maude on 1716 in Sunderland, County Durham to Samuel Maude (1665–1730), a coal fitter, and Rachel Maude (née Warren; 1667–1734). The youngest of thirteen siblings, Darby was raised in a Quaker family. By her teens she was moved to preach, but she took no action. She wanted to marry John Sinclair, but her widowed mother resisted the match until February 1734. Sinclair died in 1737, shortly after the couple's only child, Rachel, death from smallpox.

She rejected her sister's requests to rejoin society. Instead, she carried out her religious duties until 1745. It was a fellow Quaker Grace Chamber who introduced her to the Quaker widower Abraham Darby of Coalbrookdale. Grace was to remain a loyal family friend. They married at Preston Patrick on 9 March 1746.

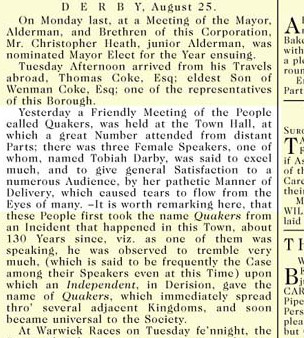
Abiah Darby (named as Tobiah (sic)) in the Town Hall, Derby

Her new husband was revolutionising the iron industry and she became the hostess to businessmen as well as fellow Quakers. Abiah recorded the details of many of their visitors between 1752 and 1769 in her journals. They had seven children, of whom four survived infancy. Sarah, Mary, Samuel and another Abraham Darby. While her children were still small, in 1746 Abiah Darby gave in to her wish to preach. Her daughter Mary was still a baby, and her husband was busy introducing his improvements to the smelting process of the ironworks in Coalbrookdale where he was a partner. Nevertheless, Abraham accompanied Abiah on some of her preaching trips by horse; on other occasions, she was usually accompanied by Ann Summerfield. It has been said that Abiah Darby "broke the shackles" of her gender's role in her evangelism of the Quaker message. In 1750 Abraham and Abiah moved into a newly built house called Sunniside, set in its own park, named after Abiah's parents' home in Bishopswearmouth.

Despite her severe outlook, Darby did not attract the hostility that faced some of her fellow women preachers. In 1754 she was credited with improving communication between the male and female groups within the Society of Friends. However, she did not just preach at home. In 1756 she wrote in her journal about the food riots, but she also spoke at three public meetings at Chesterfield in Derbyshire, Ambleside in the Lake District, and Newcastle on Tyne and Shields in the north-east of England. She was also able to obtain permission to address the soldiers stationed in Berwick upon Tweed, on England's north-east coast bordering Scotland.

In 1763 her husband died. In the same year she published Useful Instruction for Children by Way of Question and Answer, which she had written for her own children. Abiah actively supported the creation of Sunday Schools, and she visited Shrewsbury Gaol primarily to see fellow Quakers who had been jailed for non-payment of the Church of England's tithes. Also in 1763, she wrote a letter which is still extant, and although dated it is not clear to whom it was sent. This letter describes the Darby family's achievements, and she records when her husband's father first smelted iron using coke instead of charcoal. This date has been used to identify the start of the Industrial Revolution as 1709.

In August 1774 Darby spoke at a regional meeting of Quakers at Derby Town Hall. The Derby Mercury reported her name as Tobiah and said she was the best of three female speakers. The journalist also noted that she was speaking in Derby and this was the town where the Quakers first got their name. This was the town, but the newspaper gave the wrong reason. It was a Derby magistrate, Gervase Bennet, who had first used the term to deride George Fox in 1650 as he tried him for blasphemy. It is thought that Darby was speaking at the same place at which George Fox had been imprisoned, although she may not have been aware of it, as this was a new town hall.

In 1779 her daughter in law Deborah Darby began to transcribe her journal. Deborah was her son Samuel Darby's wife and she too became a Quaker preacher and began her own journal.

After twenty years of widowhood, Darby was increasingly confined to her home by infirmity. "Mother Darby" died at her home, "Sunniside" in Coalbrookdale, on 26 June 1794. Sunniside was demolished in the nineteenth century, but her first home, Dale House, is preserved as part of a museum.

== Works ==
- Serious Warning to the Inhabitants of Shrewsbury, 1752
- Epistle to the Inhabitants of Hereford, 1754
- Useful Instruction for Children by Way of Question and Answer, 1763
