= Deborah Darby =

British Quaker minister and traveller

- Born: 25 August 1754; Upperthorpe, Sheffield
- Died: 14 February 1810 (aged 55); Coalbrookdale, Shropshire
- Occupation: Quaker minister
- Spouse: Samuel Darby
- Children: 3
- Parent(s): John and Hannah Bernard

Deborah Darby (25 August 1754 – 14 February 1810) was a British Quaker minister and traveller based in Coalbrookdale, Shropshire.

== Life ==
Darby was born in 1754 in Upperthorpe, Sheffield. She was one of the six children of Hannah (born Wilson) and John Barnard who was a tanner. She was brought up with a good education and knowledge of the Christian faith.

In 1776 she married Samuel who was the son of Abraham and Abiah Darby of Coalbrookdale. The Darby family are credited with enabling the Industrial Revolution because of their transformation of the iron industry. Samuel was in charge of the Darby manufactory in London and that was where they first lived. Their first child died in 1778 and Samuel had poor mental health.

In 1779 Darby and her husband moved into Sunniside with her mother in law Abiah Darby in Coalbrookdale. She began to transcribe her journal and Deborah also began her own in August of that year.

She had three more children and two survived childbirth, Samuel in 1779 and Edmund in 1782. She began to travel and to preach.

Darby and Rebecca Young set out for the US in August 1793. Darby is thought to have visited every meeting house. At the Long Island Meeting House she made a big impression on the French emigre Stephen Grellet who had a background in iron making before he had left France because of the French Revolution. Under her and William Savery's influence he decided to join the Society of Friends and he became an important figure in the Quaker movement. Darby, Savery and Grellet became friends and when Darby returned to Britain with Rebecca Young she was accompanied by four American Quakers (including William Savery) and her friend Stephen Grellet was there to wave them off. They sailed aboard the Sussex at a cost of £210.

Darby continued to travel and preach and returned to Coalbrookdale where she met Priscilla Gurney who was also a travelling Quaker minister. Elizabeth Fry who was trying to plan her life was staying with Gurney in the hope that her steadying influence might assist her. She had an important meeting with Darby who said that she saw that Elizabeth would influence many people. It was at this meeting that Elizabeth Fry realised that she was going to be a Quaker. She would later credit William Savery, Darby and Gurney with influencing her decision to devote her life to good works.

Darby died in Coalbrookdale in 1810 and was buried beside her husband.
