= Thomas Baylies =

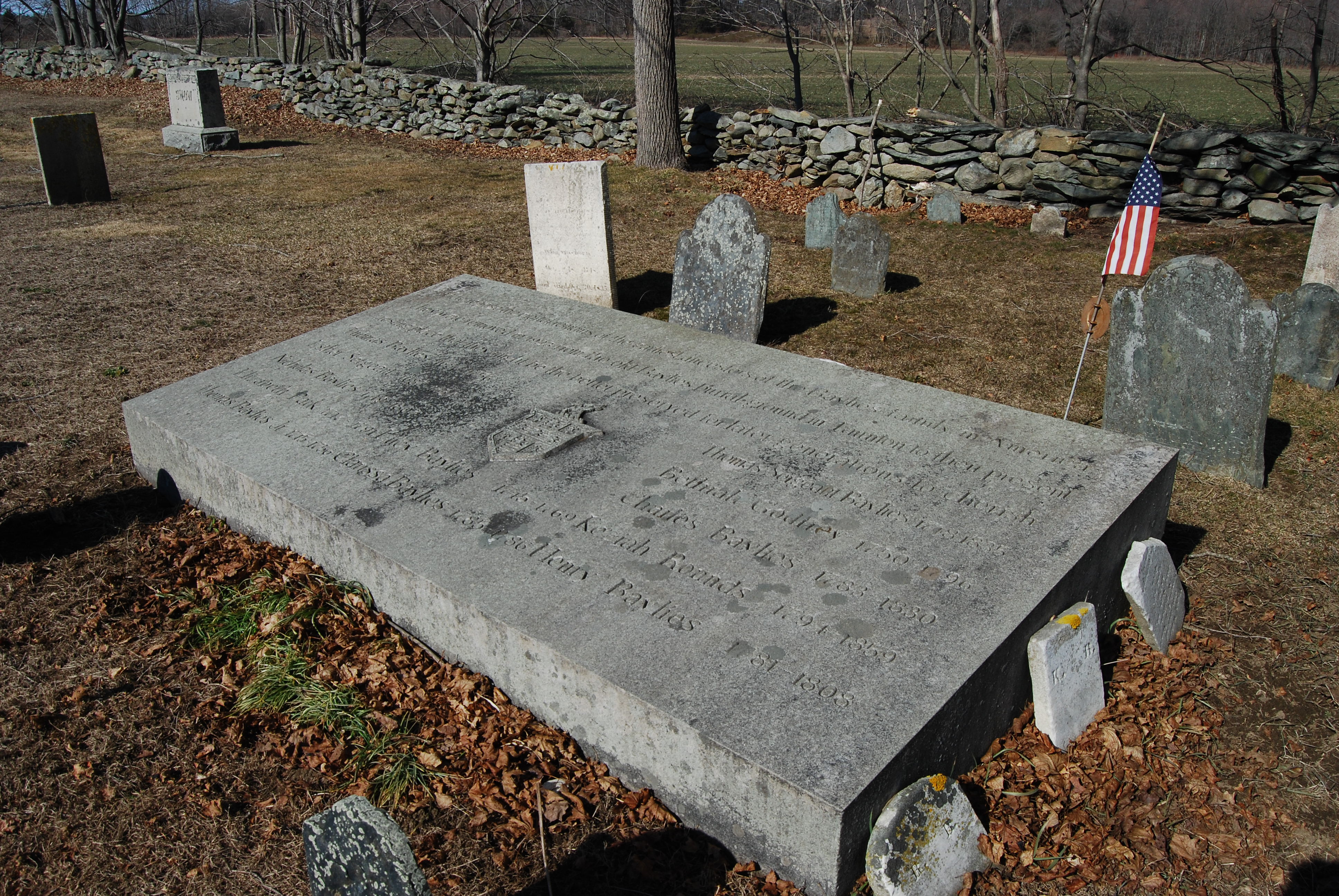
Final resting place of Thomas Baylies and his family, Dighton, Massachusetts

Thomas Baylies (1687–March 1756) was a Quaker ironmaster first in England, then in Massachusetts.

== Origins and family ==
Thomas Baylies was the son of Nicholas Baylies of Alvechurch in north Worcestershire. On 5 June 1706, he married Esther, daughter of Thomas Seargeant of Fulford Heath, in Solihull in a Quaker ceremony at which 38 witnesses were present. They had eight children. Esther's sister Mary married Abraham Darby I.

== Coalbrookdale ==
By 1714, Baylies had joined his brother-in-law, Abraham Darby, at his Coalbrookdale ironworks, becoming a partner with him and John Chamberlain. Together they built a second blast furnace at Coalbrookdale and secured the rights to build a furnace at Dolgûn near Dolgellau and taking over Vale Royal Furnace in 1718. However, Darby died in July 1717, before any progress was made with either project, and the partnership was dissolved.

== Vale Royal Company ==
Baylies took over the Coalbrookdale Company's right to Vale Royal in Cheshire. Lacking sufficient capital, he formed a new partnership with Charles Cholmondeley of Vale Royal Abbey, Richard Turner of Pettywood and William Watts of Newton near Middlewich. Turner was concerned in a coal mine at Thatto Heath near St Helens and persuaded his partners to build a furnace at Sutton (there). They also built a forge at Acton Bridge and intended to (but perhaps did not) build another at Dean Mill in Haydock. Baylies moved to Marton near the works. The original capital of £5000 was doubled when the second furnace was planned. Baylies had difficulty in paying up the capital of his share, now reduced to one-sixth, because it was still tied up in the stock at Coalbrookdale. His difficulties were made worse by Mary Darby's death following soon after that of her husband. The company suffered substantial losses, forcing Cholmondeley to make an assignment of his estate for the benefit of his creditors, blaming his troubles on the obstinacy of Dick Turner.

== Later activities in Great Britain ==
It is not clear how long Baylies remained a partner in the Vale Royal Company; certainly he was not its clerk. In 1723, he was employed by William Wood to negotiate a lease of an iron ore mine at Frizington in Cumberland, and he may have had some involvement with his works there in 1728. However he was living in Stourbridge in Worcestershre in 1729. Between 1730 and 1735, he may have even been concerned in the management of the Culnakyle ironworks at Abernethy of the York Buildings Company. In 1735, he became the manager of a furnace near Neath, perhaps Bryncoch Furnace, which belonged to a Quaker Company from Bristol.

== Massachusetts ==
In June 1737, Baylies emigrated from London to Boston, Massachusetts, with his son Nicholas and daughter Esther. The following year, he brought over his wife and his daughters Mary and Helen. He settled at Attleborough Gore (now Cumberland, Rhode Island), where he was an ironmaster under contract (of 1738) with Richard Clarke & Co. of Boston. Another son, Thomas Jr. emigrated later, and settled in Taunton, Massachusetts, where he kept a store, and later operated an iron works there. In 1739, Nicholas moved to Uxbridge, Massachusetts to operate a forge on the Mumford River, in what is now Whitinsville.

Thomas Baylies Sr. died at Cumberland, Rhode Island in March 1756. He was buried in the family burying ground beside the Taunton River, next to his wife Esther, who had died in 1756. A few months later in July 1756, Thomas Jr. also died. Nicholas Baylies left Uxbridge to take over the works in Taunton later that same year. The Baylies Iron Works, as it became known, was located on the Three Mile River in west Taunton, near the Dighton town line. The business flourished under the leadership of Nicholas Baylies. He soon became a large land owner in the area.

After the end of the American Revolution, Hodijah, youngest son of Nicholas and a distinguished veteran of the war, took over control of the iron works. During this time, among other large contracts, he made the anchor for the frigate USS Constitution in 1797. This was considered a great event in iron manufacture at the time. It required ten yoke of oxen to transport the anchor to tidewater at Dighton, to be taken on board Old Ironsides at Boston.

Hodijah continued in the iron business until 1810, when he received the appointment of judge of probate, which office he held twenty four years. He disposed of the privilege and old mills to John West in 1809, who built the paper mill on the opposite side of the river. West, who had been a merchant in Boston, was the first paper manufacturer in the Old Colony. In 1823–24, West associated with Crocker & Richmond built a cotton mill on the site of the old iron works. He continued as agent of the cotton and paper mills until the time of his death in 1827. The cotton mill was then managed by Crocker & Richmond until the time of their suspension in 1837. It later became part of Whittenton Mills, operating as Westville Spinning Mill. In 1930, a bronze plaque was placed near the spot once occupied by the Baylies Iron Works.

The Baylies family became very well known in the Taunton and Dighton area for many years, including William Baylies and Francis Baylies, who represented Massachusetts in the United States Congress during the early 1800s, and Nicholas Baylies, who served as a Justice of the Vermont Supreme Court.

In 1923, the remains of Thomas Baylies and the first branch of the family were relocated a few miles from the Walker Blake Cemetery in south Taunton to the burial ground behind the family's church in Dighton. The church is now known as the Dighton Community Church.
