= Grace Chamber =

English Quaker minister

- Born: Grace Hall; 15 October 1676; Monk Hesleden
- Died: 22 September 1762 (aged 85); Sedgwick
- Occupation: Quaker minister
- Spouse: Robert Chamber

Grace Chamber born Grace Hall (15 October 1676 – 22 September 1762) was an English Quaker minister.

== Life ==
Chamber was born in Monk Hesleden in 1676. Both of her parents had been married before. Her father James Hall had been married to Francis Walker and they had five children. Her mother had been born Grace Lamplough, and she had first married Anthony Pearson. James and Grace created a Quaker upbringing for their daughter, although there was no formal education.

When she was 27 she moved to Sedgwick following her marriage to fellow Quaker Robert Chamber on 13 January 1704. She lived in his family home. After eight years of marriage, her skills were recognised as a minister within the Quaker church. She did travel but in the company of her husband, and she was not known for her eloquence. She knew people. It was Chamber who introduced widow Abiah Sinclair to Quaker widower Abraham Darby of Coalbrookdale. Grace was to remain a loyal family friend. They married at Preston Patrick on 9 March 1746.

Throughout her life, she was known for her medical skills. She would make up "powders" to ease coughs and breathlessness. This seems to have developed from her interest in these matters when she was a child. She complimented her husband for putting up with her medical projects, as their mom attracted the sick and lame.

In 1743, she took Frances Henshaw into her home for a month. She was a Quaker convert who had become a popular minister. Her critics said "too popular". Chamber allowed the exhausted Henshaw to recover herself and to continue on her mission.

== Death and legacy ==
Chamber died in Sedgwick in 1676. Her letters Grace Chamber's letters are the Library of the Society of Friends in London.
