= Baptist Mills, Bristol =

Neighbourhood of Bristol, England

Coordinates: 51.4665°N 2.5745°W

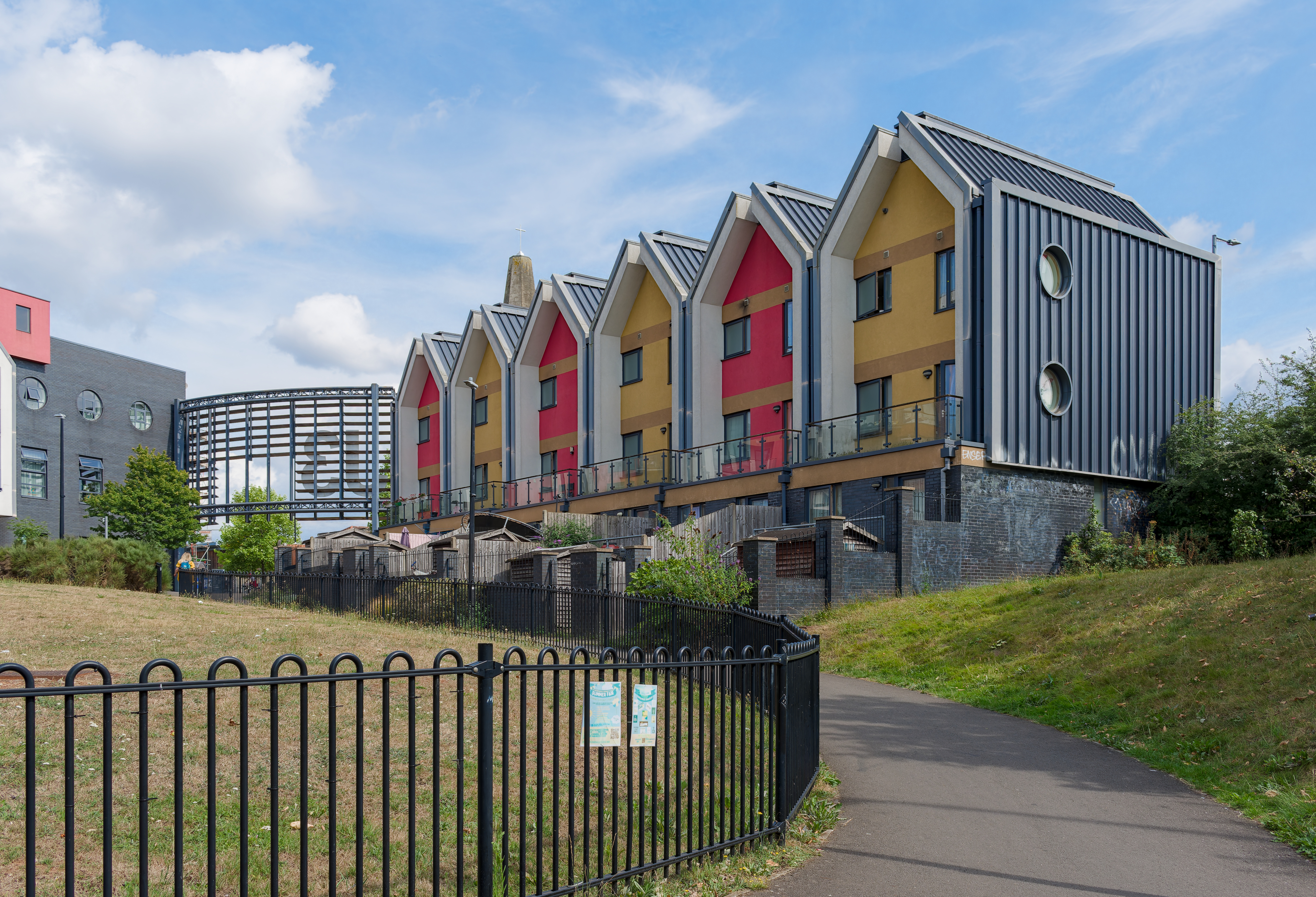
The 21st-century mixed-use development known as Junction 3 now dominates the landscape of Baptist Mills

Baptist Mills is an area of the city of Bristol, England. The name derives from the former mills which stood in that area. The area is centred on the River Frome at Junction 3 of the M32 Motorway. Construction of the motorway divided the neighbourhood such that parts west of the road are now often considered to be part of St Werburghs, while parts to the east are often described as being in Easton.

== Geology ==
The solid geology of Baptist Mills comprises Triassic Redcliffe Sandstone, which is overlain by superficial deposits of Quaternary alluvium in the floodplain of the Horfield Brook and the River Frome.

== History ==
Baptist Mills is so named from the mills that once stood there. A grist (flour) mill is recorded in this area in a document written in 1470, and again in 1610, when they are marked on Chester and Master's Map of Kingswood.

The mills were converted to brass mills by the Bristol Brass Company, formed in 1702 by Abraham Darby, Edward Lloyd, John Andrews, and Arthur Thomas. The venture was financed by a group of Quakers using capital derived in part from the colonial slave trade economy. Other early partners included Benjamin Coole, Nehemiah Champion II, and John and Thomas Coster.

In 1706, further partners were admitted, the business becoming an early unincorporated joint stock company with a capital of £8000. While there, Darby recruited skilled 'Dutchmen' to operate a brass battery with trip hammers. He may also have recruited men skilled in sand moulding as opposed to the loam moulding hitherto used in England. Darby was the active partner in the business, but later withdrew to concentrate on his new ironfounding business at Coalbrookdale. Following Darby's departure around 1708, the works came under the management of Nehemiah Champion III. The works had significantly expanded by 1712 to operate 25 furnaces with an annual production of 250 to 260 tons of brass.

Brass production at the Baptist Mills Brass Works ceased in 1814, and in 1839 parts of the former brass works were acquired Joseph and James White, who established a factory manufacturing "Egyptian Black" pottery, Rockingham teapots and clay tobacco pipes. By 1861 the business was known as the Phoenix Pottery. The pottery closed at some point after 1891.

The last remains of the brass works were destroyed when Junction 3 of the M32 Motorway was constructed in the early 1970s. However, slag blocks made from waste from the works can be found in the area.
