= Charles Reeves (architect) =

British architect

- Born: 1815
- Died: December 6, 1866
- Citizenship: Great Britain
- Occupation: architect

Charles Reeves (1815 – 6 December 1866) was a British architect, particularly of police stations and county courts.

== Life ==
Reeves was born in 1815 in Fordingbridge, Hampshire. He studied under Thomas Loader of Romsey in Hampshire, and Richard Suter (father of Richard George Suter) and Annesley Voysey of London. From 1843 he was architect and surveyor to the Metropolitan Police, designing and superintending forty-four new police stations. In 1847 he also became architect to the county courts in England and Wales, established the previous year; he designed and superintended sixty-four new courts across the country.

He maintained a practice in London with Henry Annesley Voysey from 1847 to 1852, and with Lewis George Butcher from 1853. His private commissions included Holy Trinity Church at Coalbrookdale, Shropshire.

His style was mostly a version of Italianate architecture. A medal was awarded to Reeves for services in connection with the exhibitions of 1851 and 1862. He died in Halterworth, Romsey in 1866.
