= Priscilla Gurney =

British Quaker minister (1757–1828)

- Born: 22 June 1757; Norwich
- Died: 17 November 1828 (aged 71); Bath
- Occupation: Quaker minister

Priscilla Hannah Gurney (22 June 1757 – 17 November 1828) was a British Quaker minister.

== Life ==
Gurney was born in Norwich in 1757. Her parents were Christiana Barclay and Joseph Gurney. Her father died whilst she was four and her mother married again to her cousin John Freame who in turn died in 1770.

She sorted out her own spiritual life by reading a book that was important to the Quakers, An Apology for the True Christian Divinity. It was written by Robert Barclay in 1676. Barclay was one of her ancestors. and as she read it she realised that she and Barclay were of one mind on many issues. The conclusion was that she was a Quaker and she had been trying to resist this conclusion by enjoying an enthusiastic social life.

Around 1784 she had problems with a spurned suitor who was a Quaker. He refused to accept Gurney's refusal of his marriage proposal. She was ill and amongst her visitors was Mary Davis. She and Davis were bosom friends and they wanted to share a home. Through her she met her "parental friends", Richard and Rebecca Reynolds of Coalbrookdale. Mary died in childbirth in 1791 and the Reynolds became her consolation.

In 1792 she was appointed as a Quaker minister and she would preach as far north as Scotland and as far south as the Scilly Isles. She is noted particularly as the person chosen to assist Elizabeth Fry when she was unsure of herself. She went to stay with Gurney in the hope that her steadying influence might assist Elizabeth as she was unsure of her future. Whilst she was staying with her Elizabeth had an important meeting with Deborah Darby who said that she saw that Elizabeth would influence people. It was at this meeting that Elizabeth realised that she was going to be a Quaker. She would later credit William Savery, Darby and Gurney with influencing her decision.

Gurney died in Bath in 1828. Six years after her death her autobiography was published. Gurney had written it but had been unsure about its publication.
