= Holy Trinity Church, Coalbrookdale =

Holy Trinity Church
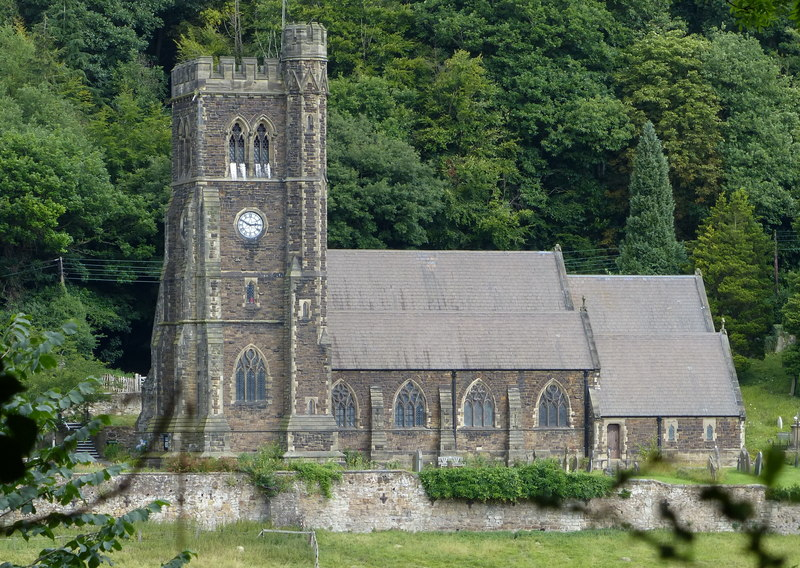
- Holy Trinity Church
- 52°38′12.840″N 2°29′17.844″W
- OS grid reference: SJ 67053 04465
- Location: Coalbrookdale, Shropshire
- Country: England
- Denomination: Church of England
- Website: www.coalironlitt.co.uk

Architecture
- Heritage designation: Grade II*
- Designated: 8 April 1983
- Architect: Reeves and Voysey
- Completed: 1854

Administration
- Diocese: Hereford

Holy Trinity Church is an Anglican church in Coalbrookdale, Shropshire, England. It is part of the United Benefice of Coalbrookdale, Ironbridge and Little Wenlock, in the Diocese of Hereford. The building is Grade II* listed.

== Description ==
The parish of Coalbrookdale was formed in 1851, from Ironbridge and Little Dawley; the patronage of the new living was conferred on Abraham Darby IV, a member of the family of ironmasters at Coalbrookdale. He gave money for the building of a new church, and Adelaide Anna Darby (who married Henry Whitmore in 1852) gave the site. The church, designed by Reeves and Voysey, was built from 1851 to 1854, and it was consecrated by Renn Hampden, Bishop of Hereford, on 25 July 1854.

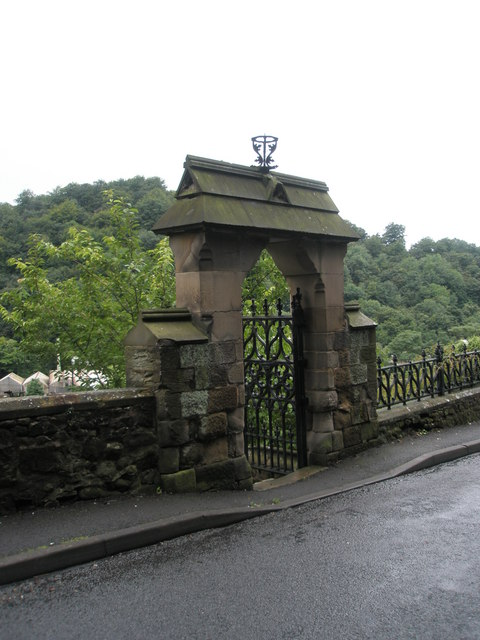
The east gate to the church; the churchyard wall, railings and gates, contemporary with the church, are Grade II listed.

The building, orientated south-east, is in Decorated Gothic style. It is built of local stone and has slate roofs; there is a large tower with an embattled parapet and an octagonal corner stair turret. Inside is a chancel, and a nave of eight bays with north and south aisles. In the south aisle there is a 16th-century Flemish stained glass window of The Last Supper, donated by Adelaide Anna Derby.

The ring of eight bells, donated by Abraham Darby IV in 1852, was augmented in 1925 by two treble bells, in memory of Maurice Darby, killed in action in 1915. The chancel was refurbished in 1931 to designs of H. S. Goodhart-Rendel. The organ, with two manuals, is by Harrison & Harrison.

The churchyard contains the graves of Abraham Darby IV, and of the parents of Matthew Webb, the first person to swim the English Channel, as well as heraldic expert Arthur Charles Fox-Davies. It also contains the Commonwealth war graves of two British Army soldiers of World War I and one of World War II.

== See also ==
- Listed buildings in The Gorge
