= Beller =

Beller is a surname. Notable people with the surname include:

- Bryan Beller (born 1971), American bass guitarist
- Hava Kohav Beller, German-born filmmaker
- Kathleen Beller (born 1956), American actress
- Marty Beller (born 1967), American musician and songwriter
- Mary Linn Beller (1933–2000), American child actress
- Thomas Beller (born 1965), American author and editor
- William Beller (1900–1986), American concert pianist and music professor

== See also ==
- Bellers, another surname
