= Abraham Darby III =

English ironmaster and Quaker (1750–1789)

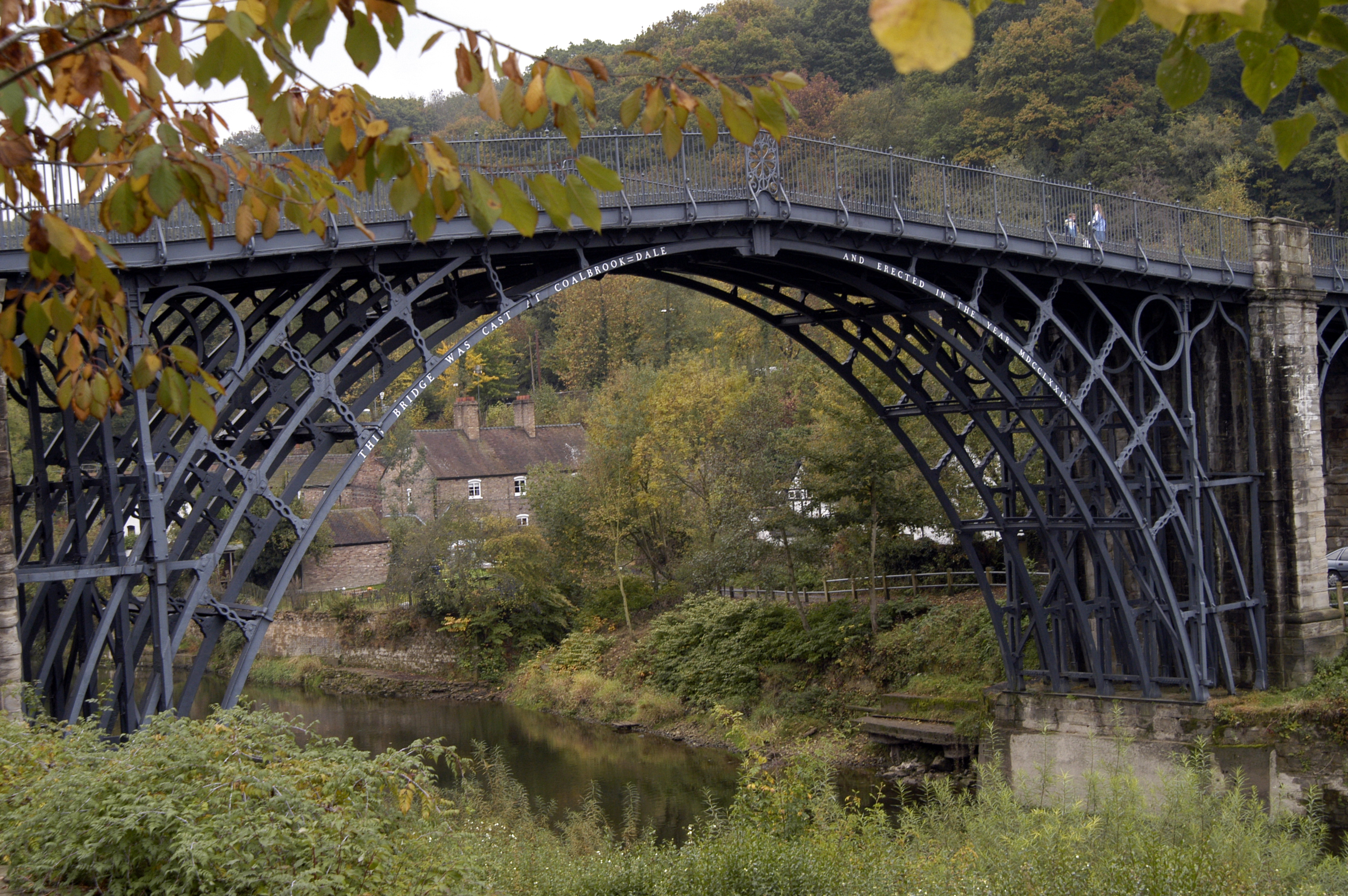
The Iron Bridge

Abraham Darby III (24 April 1750 – 1789) was an English ironmaster and Quaker. He was the third man of that name in several generations of an English Quaker family that played a pivotal role in the Industrial Revolution.

== Life ==
Abraham Darby was born in Coalbrookdale, Shropshire, in 1750, the eldest son of Abraham Darby the Younger (1711–1763) by his second wife, Abiah Maude, and educated at a school in Worcester kept by a Quaker named James Fell.

At age thirteen, Darby inherited his father's shares in the family iron-making businesses in the Severn Valley, and in 1768, aged eighteen, he took over the management of the Coalbrookdale ironworks. He took various measures to improve the conditions of his work force. In times of food shortage he bought up farms to grow food for his workers, he built housing for them, and he offered higher wages than were paid in other local industries, including coal-mining and the potteries. He built the largest cast iron structure of his era: the first cast-iron bridge ever built, as a crossing over the Severn near Coalbrookdale. The bridge made it possible for the village of Ironbridge to grow up around it, with the area being subsequently named Ironbridge Gorge.

In 1776 Darby married Rebecca Smith of Doncaster, and they had seven children, of whom four survived to adulthood. He died in Madeley aged only 39 and was buried in the Quaker burial ground in Coalbrookdale. His sons Francis (1783–1850) and Richard (1788–1860) both worked in the Coalbrookdale Company.

== Tributes ==
A secondary school in Telford is named after him: Abraham Darby Academy.

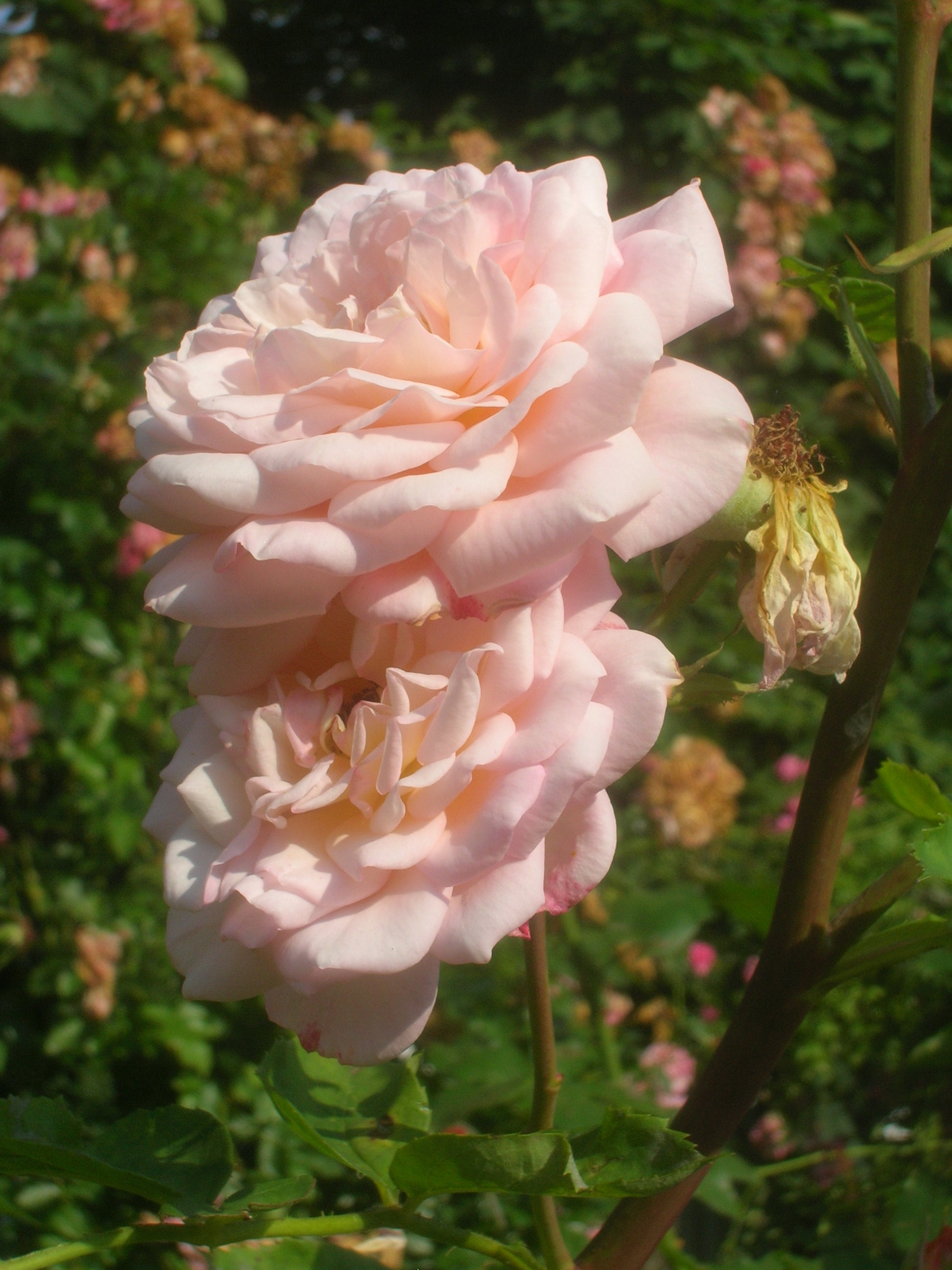
Rosa 'Abraham Darby', Austin 1985

In 1985 a rose cultivar Rosa 'Abraham Darby' bred by David C.H. Austin was named after Abraham Darby.

== See also ==
- Abraham Darby I
- Abraham Darby II
- Abraham Darby IV
