= Central Quaker Meeting House =

Friends meeting house in Bristol, England

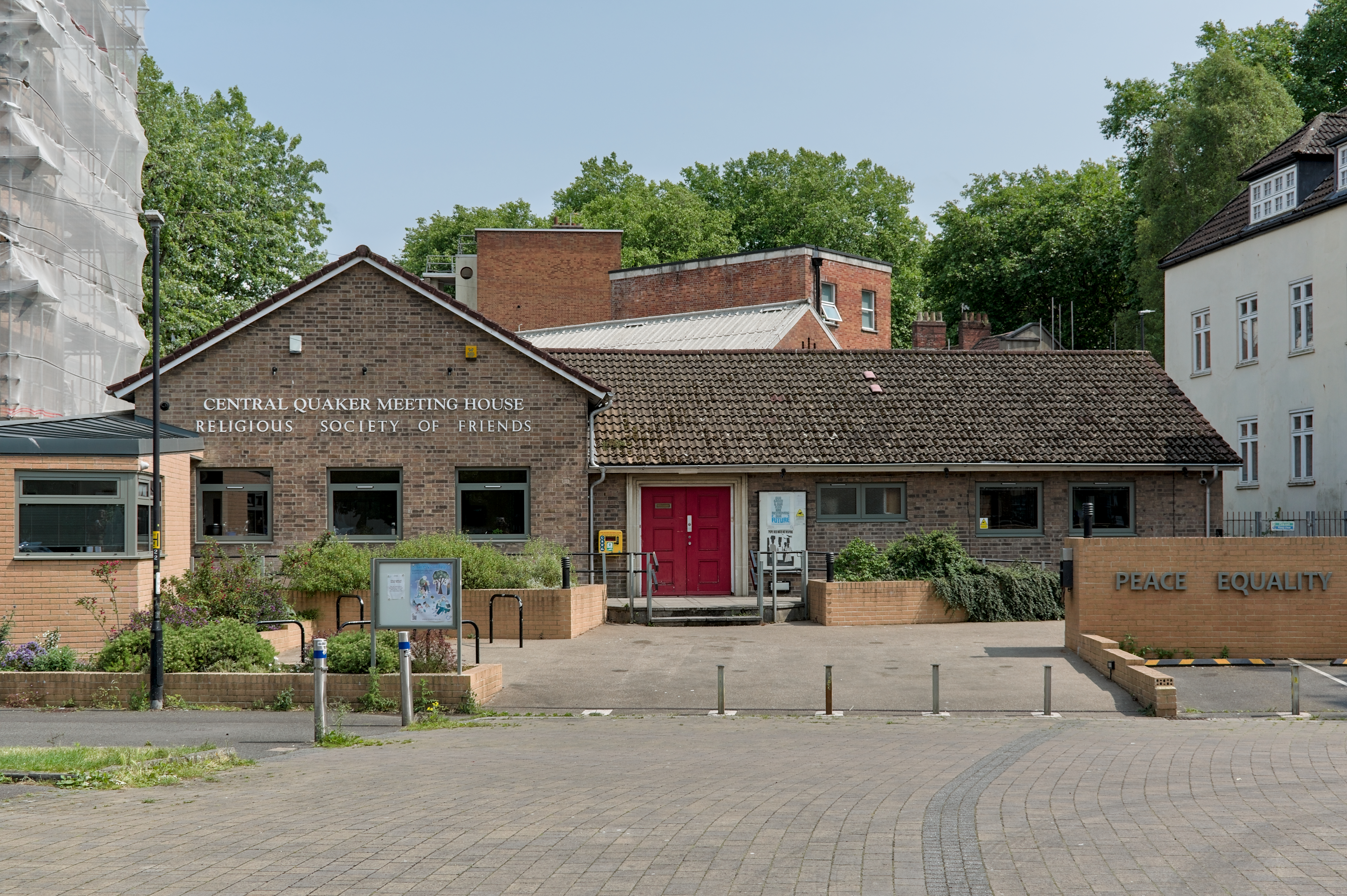
- Central Quaker Meeting House in 2025
- Central Quaker Meeting House
- 51.45816°N 2.58239°W
- Address: Champion Square, St Jude's, Bristol BS2 9DB
- Country: England
- Denomination: Religious Society of Friends
- Religious institute: Bristol Area Meeting

History
- Former name: Friars Meeting House
- Founded: 1962

Architecture
- Functional status: Active

Central Quaker Meeting House is a purpose-built Quaker meeting house in Champion Square, (Note: Since redevelopment of River Street in conjunction with the Cabot Circus development, the meeting house was re-addressed to Champion Square.) St Jude's, Bristol, England. Completed in 1962 to replace the 18th-century Quakers Friars meeting house, it remains the principal place of worship for Central Bristol Quakers and is regularly used for community welfare projects.

== History ==
=== Background ===
Bristol's first purpose-designed meeting house was erected in 1670 on the former Dominican friary site now known as Quakers Friars. That building was replaced in 1747–49 by a larger classical meeting house which served the Quakers until the mid-20th century, when Bristol City Council acquired the premises for redevelopment of Broadmead as the city's new shopping district. In 1956, Bristol Friends accepted municipal compensation and began planning the new meeting house on River Street.

=== Design and construction ===
Work on the new building was nearing completion by April 1962. The meeting house occupies the former burial ground, cleared in 1932, and stands next to the Grade II listed Quaker workhouse, now called Champion Court (see below). It is an L-shaped, single-storey building faced in buff brick with a pantile roof; the main range contains the meeting room, ancillary spaces and a small courtyard garden. The building was formally opened on 5 May 1962.

=== Subsequent development ===
Minor internal alterations to improve access were undertaken in 1994–95, and refurbishment in 2014–15. Since 2017 its hall has accommodated a part of the 365 night shelter for rough sleepers, while during the COVID-19 pandemic it functioned as a field kitchen supplying daily meals to homeless people housed in emergency hotel accommodation.

Bristol Quaker Workhouse - Champion Court, Champion Square

=== Bristol Quaker Workhouse ===
The Quakers played a notable role in early local social welfare, with the first Quaker workhouse in 1696. Influenced by John Bellers1695 proposal for a self contained "College of Industry", the Bristol scheme provided employment for Quaker weavers and education for children. By 1700, the current premises were built, combining a workhouse, school, orphanage, and almshouse.

== See also ==
- Britain Yearly Meeting
- List of churches in Bristol
