= Fettiplace Bellers =

English dramatist and philosophical writer

Fettiplace Bellers (23 September 1687 – c. 1742) was an English dramatist and philosophical writer. His most notable written work was a philosophical volume called "A Delineation of Universal Law".

== Life and work ==
Bellers was born in the parish of St. Andrew's, Holborn, London, on 23 September 1687, the son of John Bellers and his wife Frances (née Fettiplace). His parents were members of the Society of Friends, and his father was the notable writer of many tracts on the employment of the poor and other topics. Fettiplace left the Quaker faith, perhaps explaining the title of his anonymous play, "Injur'd Innocence, a tragedy" (London, 1732) which was performed at the Drury Lane Theatre, London, in February 1732. The plot was partly taken from William Davenant's "Unfortunate Lovers". The play was not successful, although it was performed six or eight times.

A work, "Of the Ends of Society", which did not appear until 1759, was drawn up in 1722. It is an outline of matters relating to government and social organisation, arranged in an elaborate classification. His most important work, however, is "A Delineation of Universal Law: being an Abstract or Essay towards deducing the Elements of Natural Law from the First Principles of Knowledge and the Nature of Things. In a methodical and connected series. In five books : (1) Of law in general, (2) Of private law, (3) Of criminal law, (4) Of the laws of magistracy, (5) Of the law of nations". It was printed for Dodsley in 1750. The advertisement for the work shows that this was a posthumous publication, although "proposals", and perhaps a specimen copy, had been issued at an earlier date; the advertisement goes on to state that "the author had been engaged in the great work of which this is an abstract for twenty years". Lowndes, Allibone, and Smith speak of this as having been issued in 1740, but this appears to be an error for 1750. A second edition is recorded for 1754, and a third for 1759.

Lowndes described "A Delineation of Universal Law" as "an excellent outline" whilst Marvin, referring to the long time that the author spent upon the work, says: "It is with a feeling of regret, mingled with something like reproach, that we find the labours of twenty years so wasted, and reflect upon the great expenditure of time and diligence that has been destitute of any useful result." The advertisement to the "Delineation" printed in 1750 distinctly states that Bellers was then dead, and yet the official archives of the Royal Society record that he was elected a fellow 30 Nov. 1711, was admitted 17 April 1712, and withdrew from the society 12 April 1752. The puzzle was solved by a letter which shows that he was actually deceased before 19 August 1742.

According to a memorandum made by Mendes de Costa, the remains of his collections were in the hands of Ingram, Esq., at Northleach, in Gloucestershire (according to the DNB, 1885).
