= Abraham Darby IV =

English ironmaster (1804–1878)

Abraham Darby IV (30 March 1804 – 28 November 1878) was an English ironmaster.

He was born in Dale House, Coalbrookdale, Shropshire the son of Edmund Darby, a member of the Darby ironmaking family, and Lucy (née Burlingham) Darby. He was a Great-Grandson of Abraham Darby II.

In 1830, he and his brother Alfred took over the management of the Horsehay foundry, one of several foundries owned by the family business, and set about re-establishing the Coalbrookdale Company's reputation by investing in new technology there for the manufacture of wrought iron.

In 1844, he became a major shareholder in the Ebbw Vale ironworks in South Wales. After a series of family disagreements, he resigned his management of the Coalbrookdale Company in 1849, and, in 1851, bought Stoke Court, Stoke Poges in Buckinghamshire, and moved to live there. He also rented property at Treberfydd in Breconshire, Wales. He acted as a justice of the peace in both counties, and, in 1853, was appointed High Sheriff of Buckinghamshire. He also became a member of the Institution of Mechanical Engineers.

Although born into a notable Quaker family, Darby joined the Church of England and paid for the building of Holy Trinity church in Coalbrookdale between 1850 and 1854. In 1851 a new ecclesiastical parish was formed out of Ironbridge and Little Dawley, and Darby became patron of the new benefice, with the right to nominate the parish priest.

In 1839 he married his cousin Matilda Frances, a daughter of Francis Darby. He died at Treberfydd on 28 November 1878, aged 74, and was buried at the church he had had built in Coalbrookdale. After his death, his widow became patron of the church benefice and lived until 1902. After that, the patronage remained with the owners of the Sunniside estate until 1959, when it was transferred to the Bishop of Hereford.
