= Ironmaster =

Manager of an iron forge or blast furnace

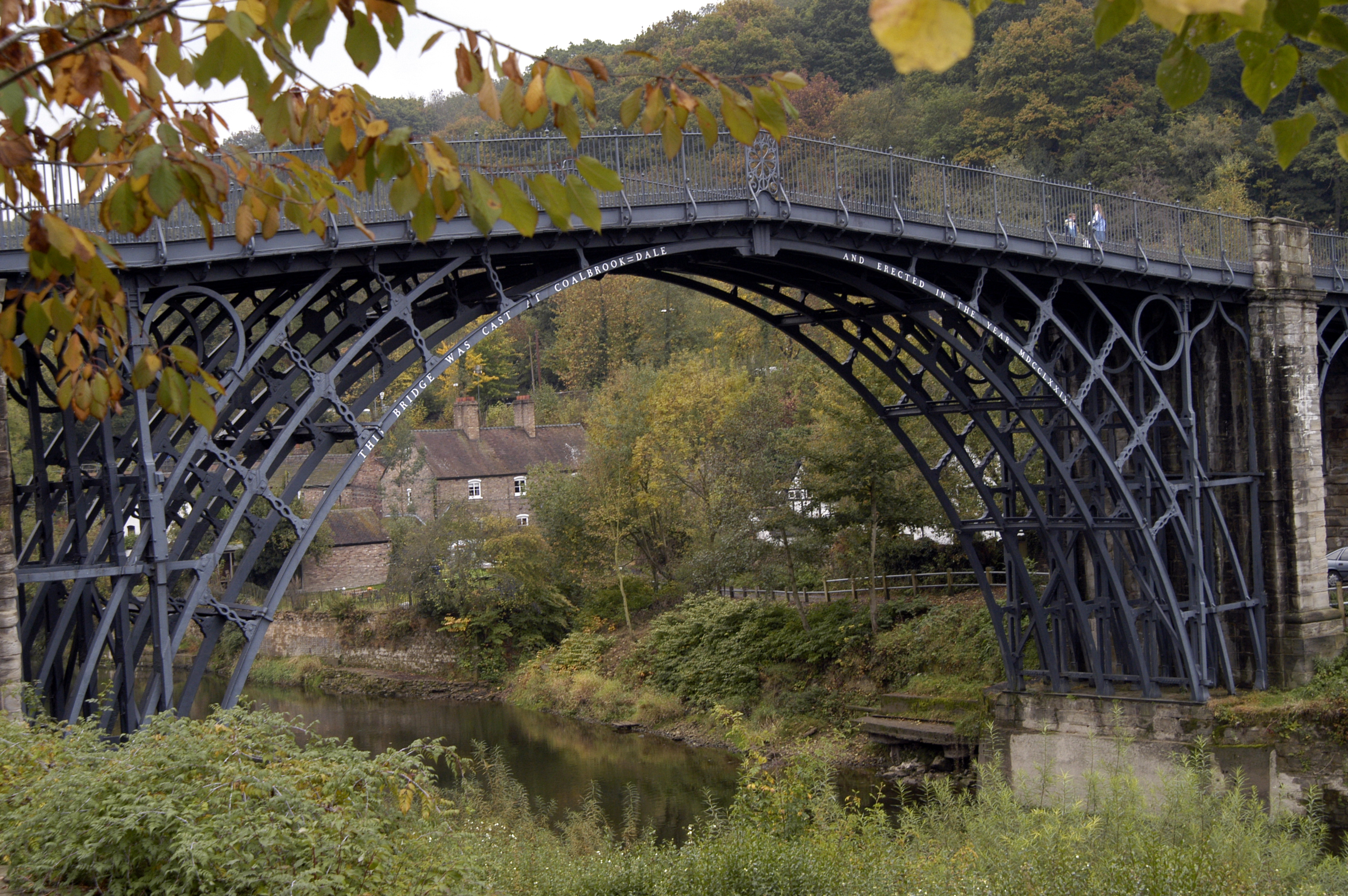
The Iron Bridge of Abraham Darby's Coalbrookdale works

An ironmaster is the manager, and usually owner, of a forge or blast furnace for the processing of iron. It is a term mainly associated with the period of the Industrial Revolution, especially in Great Britain.

The ironmaster was usually a large-scale entrepreneur and thus an important member of a community. He would have a large country house or mansion as his residence. The organization of operations surrounding the smelting, refining, and casting of iron was labour-intensive, and so there would be numerous workers reliant on the furnace works.

There were ironmasters (possibly not called such) from the 17th century onward, but they became more prominent with the great expansion in the British iron industry during the Industrial Revolution.

== 17th-century ironmasters (examples) ==
An early ironmaster was John Winter (about 1600–1676) who owned substantial holdings in the Forest of Dean. During the English Civil War he cast cannons for Charles I. Following the Restoration, Winter developed his interest in the iron industry, and experimented with a new type of coking oven. This was a precursor to the later work of Abraham Darby I who successfully used coke to smelt iron.

== 18th-century ironmasters (examples) ==
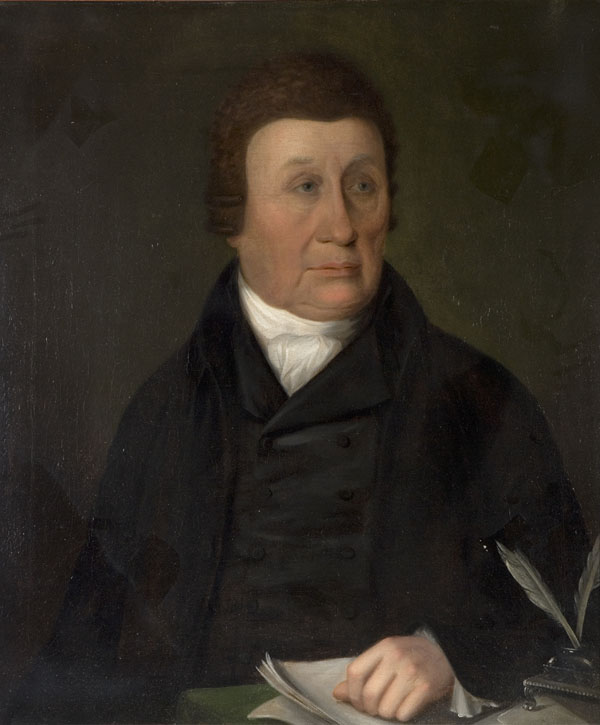
"Iron mad" John Wilkinson (1728–1808)

=== Abraham Darby ===
Three successive generations of the same family, all bearing the name Abraham Darby are renowned for their contributions to the development of the English iron industry. Their works at Coalbrookdale in Shropshire nurtured the start of improvements in metallurgy that allowed large-scale production of the iron that made the development of steam engines and railways possible, although their most notable innovation was The Iron Bridge.

=== John Wilkinson ===
One of the best-known ironmasters of the early part of the industrial revolution was John Wilkinson (1728–1808), who was considered to have "iron madness", extending even to making cast iron coffins. Wilkinson's patented method for boring iron cylinders was first used to create cannons, but later provided the precision needed to create James Watt's first steam engines.

=== Samuel Van Leer ===
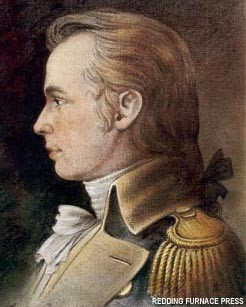
"Capt Van Leer" Samuel Van Leer, (1747–1825)

Samuel Van Leer was a well-known ironmaster and a United States Army officer during the American Revolutionary War. He started a military career with enthusiasm with his neighbor General Anthony Wayne in 1775. His furnace, Reading Furnace in Pennsylvania, supplied cannon and cannonballs for the Continental Army. Van Leer's furnace was a center of colonial ironmaking and is associated with the introduction of the Franklin Stove, and the retreat of George Washington's army following its defeat at the Battle of Brandywine, where they came for musket repairs. The location is listed as a temporary George Washington Headquarter.

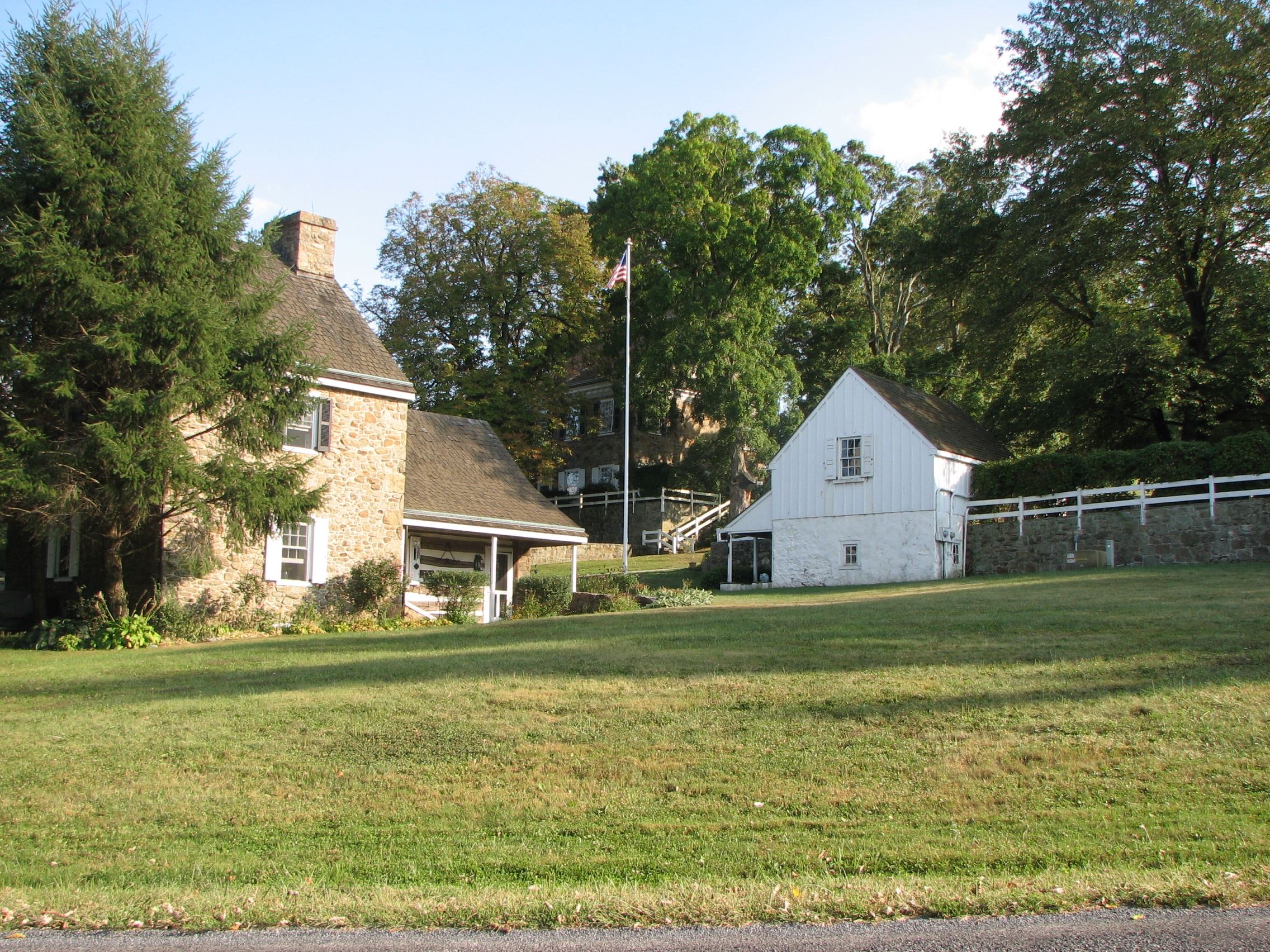
"Reading Furnace Property", Reading Furnace Historic District

W Van Leer's children all joined the iron business as well.

== 19th-century ironmasters (examples) ==
=== Lowthian Bell ===
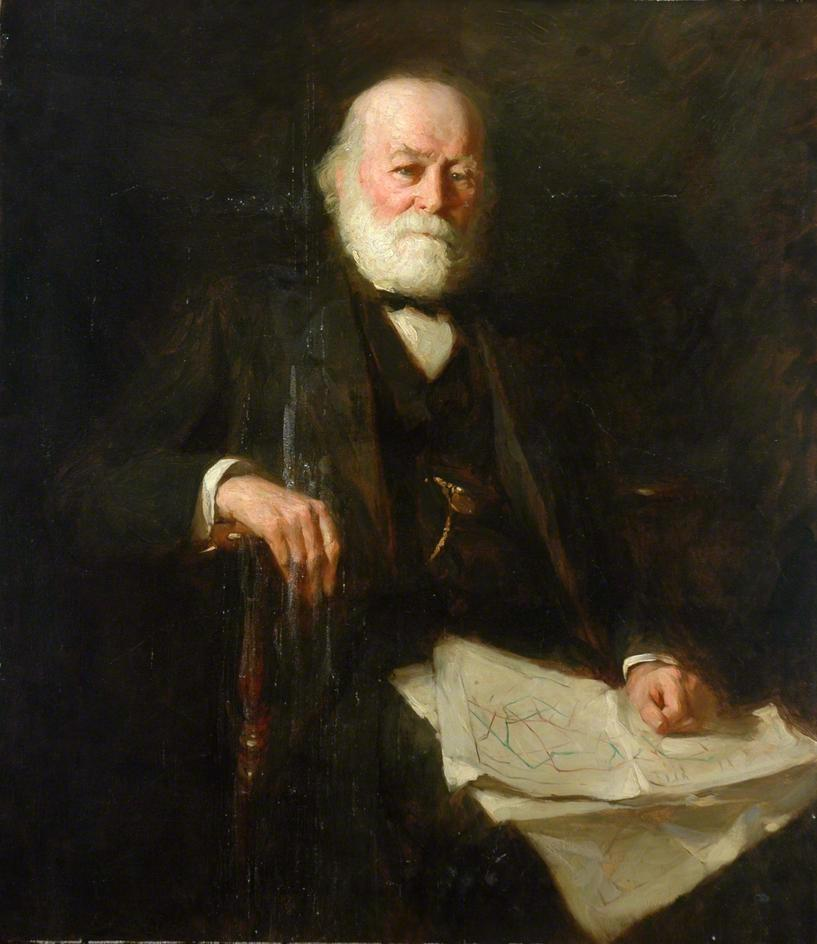
Lowthian Bell, (1816–1904) by Frank Bramley

Lowthian Bell (1816–1904) was, like Abraham Darby, the forceful patriarch of an ironmaking dynasty. Both his son Hugh Bell and his grandson Maurice Bell were directors of the Bell Iron and steel company. His father, Thomas Bell, was a founder of Losh, Wilson and Bell, an iron and alkali company. The firm had works at Walker, near Newcastle upon Tyne, and at Port Clarence, Middlesbrough, contributing largely to the growth of those towns and of the economy of the northeast of England. Bell accumulated a large fortune, with mansions including Washington New Hall, Rounton Grange near Northallerton, and the mediaeval Mount Grace Priory near Osmotherley.

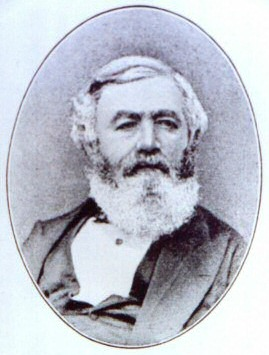
Henry Bolckow (1806–1878), founder and financier

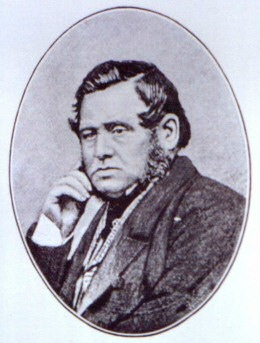
John Vaughan (1799–1868), founder and ironmaster

=== Henry Bolckow and John Vaughan ===
Henry Bolckow (1806–1878) and John Vaughan (1799–1868) were lifelong business partners, friends, and brothers-in-law. They established what became the largest of all Victorian era iron and steel companies, Bolckow Vaughan, in Middlesbrough. Bolckow brought financial acumen, and Vaughan brought ironmaking and engineering expertise. The two men trusted each other implicitly and "never interfered in the slightest degree with each other's work. Mr. Bolckow had the entire management of the financial department, while Mr. Vaughan as worthily controlled the practical work of the establishment." At its peak, the firm was the largest steel producer in Britain, possibly in the world.

=== Andrew Handyside ===
Andrew Handyside (1805–1887) was born in Edinburgh and set up works in Derby where he made ornamental items, bridges and pillar boxes, many of which survive today.

=== Samuel Richards ===
Samuel Richards (1769–1842) was born in Philadelphia to William Richards, the manager of the Batsto Iron Works beginning in 1784. Samuel Richards was heavily involved with the early 19th century iron industry in southern New Jersey. His most notable enterprise was the management of the iron works at Atsion, New Jersey from 1824 until his death in 1842. He was also involved with Martha Furnace, and Weymouth Furnace.

== See also ==
- Pig iron
- Wrought iron
