= Abraham Darby I =

English ironmaster and Quaker (1677–1717)

Abraham Darby
- Born: 14 April 1677; Woodsetton, England, Kingdom of England
- Died: 5 May 1717 (aged 40); Madeley, England, Great Britain
- Burial place: Broseley, England, United Kingdom
- Spouse: Mary Sergeant
- Children: Abraham
- Parent(s): John Darby; Ann Baylies

Abraham Darby, in his later life called Abraham Darby the Elder, now sometimes known for convenience as Abraham Darby I (14 April 1677 – 5 May 1717, the first and best known of several men of that name), was an English ironmaster and foundryman. Born into an English Quaker family that played an important role in the Industrial Revolution, Darby developed a method of producing pig iron in a blast furnace fuelled by coke rather than charcoal. This was a major step forward in the production of iron as a raw material for the Industrial Revolution.

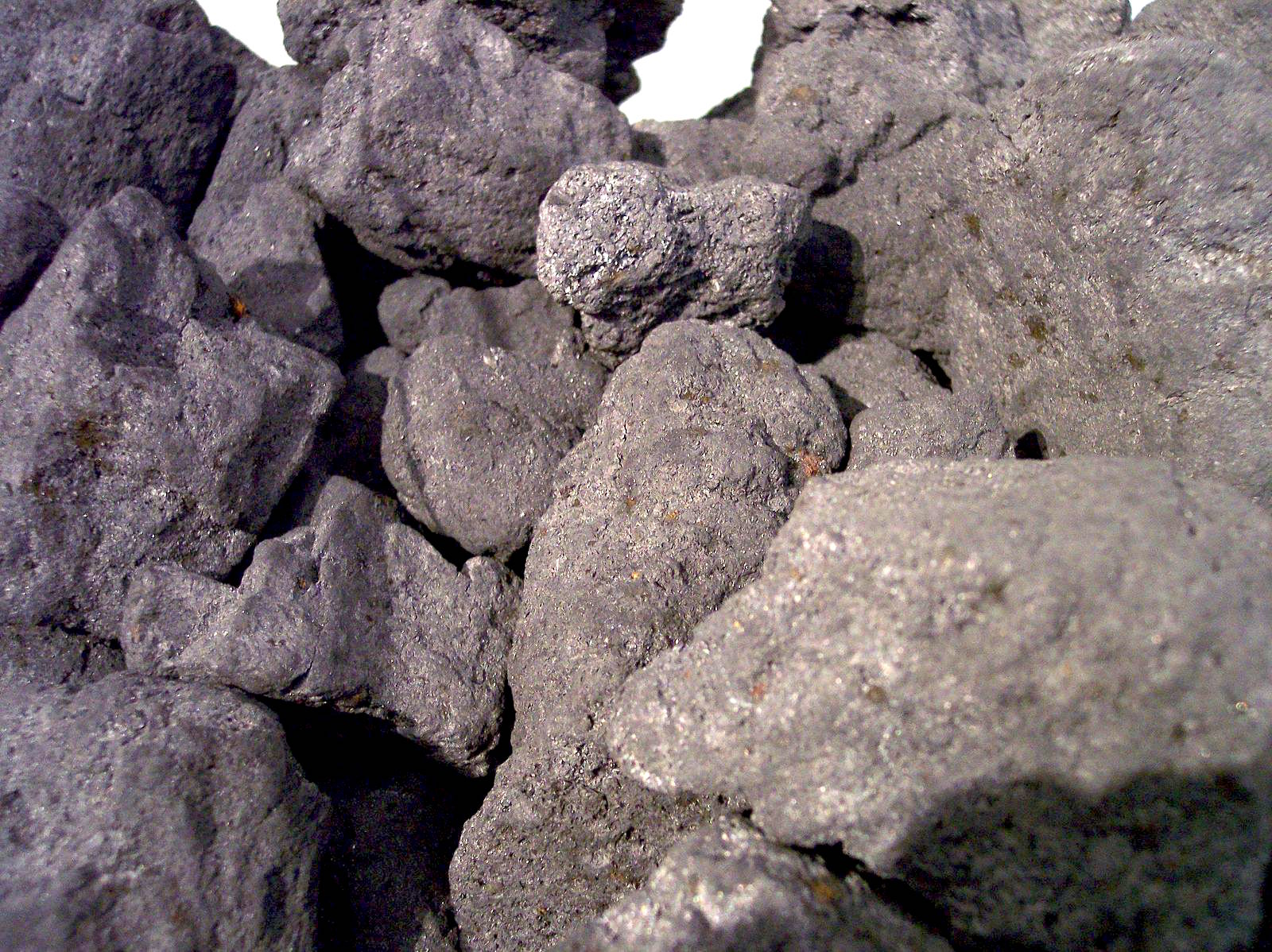
Raw coke

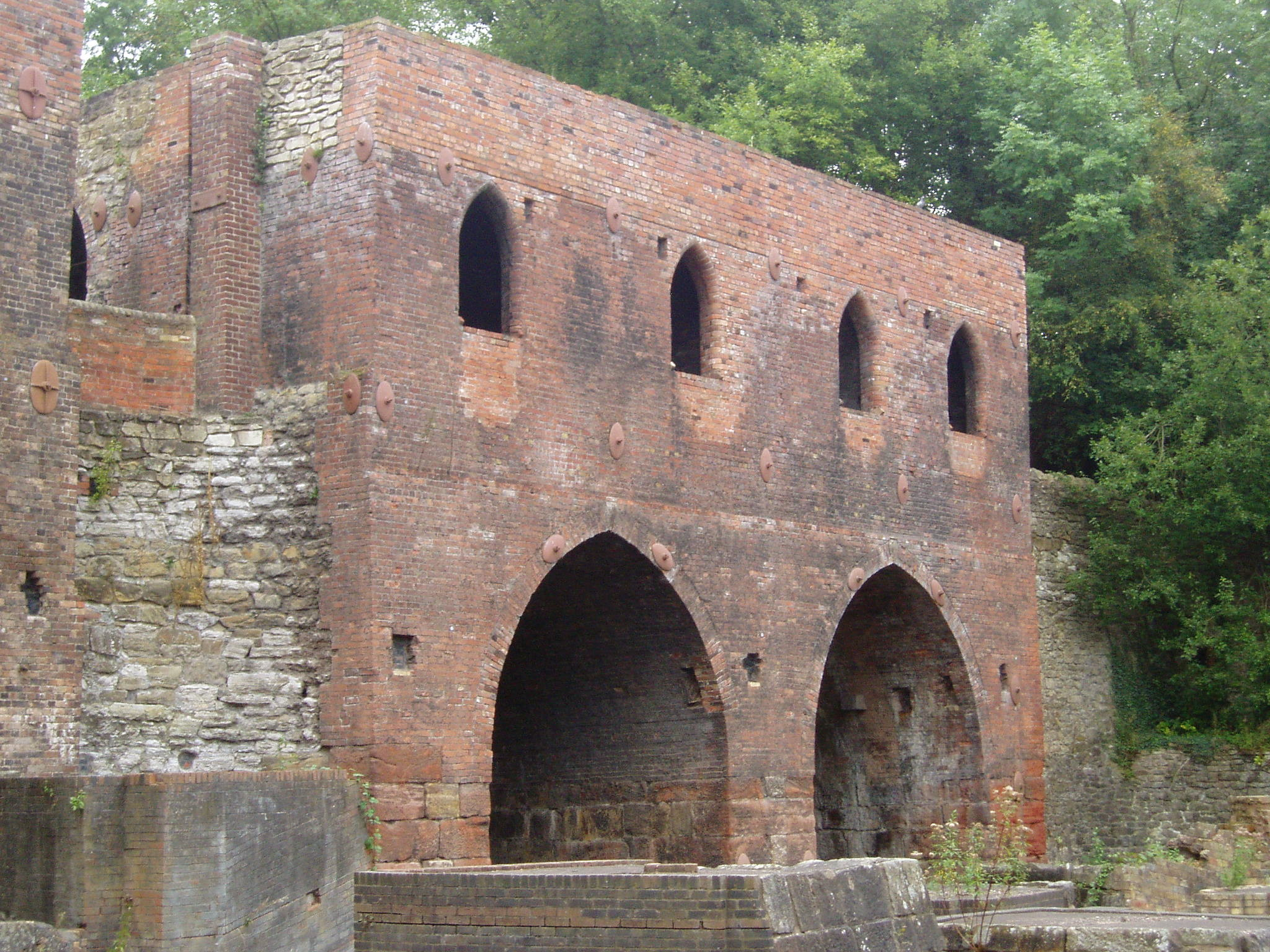
The original blast furnaces at Blists Hill, Madeley

== Early life ==
Abraham Darby was the son of John Darby, a yeoman farmer and locksmith by trade, and his wife Ann Baylies. He was born at Wren's Nest in Woodsetton, Staffordshire, now part of Dudley, West Midlands. He was descended from nobility; his great-grandmother Jane was an illegitimate child of Edward Sutton.

Abraham's great-grandmother was a sister of the whole blood to Dud Dudley, who claimed to have smelted iron using coal as a fuel. Unfortunately, the iron that Dudley produced was not acceptable to the charcoal ironmasters. However, this may have inspired his great-grandnephew Darby to perfect this novel method of smelting.

In Birmingham in the early 1690s, Darby was apprenticed to Jonathan Freeth, a fellow Quaker and a manufacturer of brass mills for grinding malt. Here Darby would have seen the use of coke to fuel malting ovens, not only preventing the sulphur content of coal from contaminating the resulting beer, but also avoiding its use of the scarcer charcoal as a fuel. The combination of these two insights was to lead to Darby's development of the coke-fuelled blast furnace in 1709.

Freeth encouraged Darby to become a highly active member in the Society of Friends, and he remained so all his life. In 1699, when he completed his apprenticeship, he married Mary Sergeant (1678–1718) and moved to Bristol, where he set himself up as a malt mill maker.

== Bristol ==
There was a large body of Friends in business, including Nehemiah Champion, Lloyds, Harfords, Goldneys and other merchant families in Bristol, and Darby soon gained a reputation for skill and enterprise. In 1702 Darby joined a number of fellow Quakers to form the Bristol Brass Company, with works at Baptist Mills in Bristol.

During his time in Bristol, Darby was an active member of the Society of Friends (Quakers). Through the Bristol Men's Meeting, he was closely tied to the community that established the Bristol Quaker Workhouse on New Street (now called Champion Square) - the earliest real world application of John Bellers' 1695 College of Industry model. (It is recorded in 1701 that Abraham Darby and Henry Dickerson responsible for finishing the outer parts of the new workhouse building). The close-knit, intermarried network of Bristol Quaker merchants and manufacturers, meant that Darby was directly exposed to Bellers' ideas of worker welfare, manufacturing, social reform prior to moving to Coalbrookdale.

Abraham journeyed to Holland, probably in 1704, to study methods for casting brass pots. He brought in 'Dutchmen' to operate a brass battery work, making cooking pots and other holloware under a trip hammer.

He also developed a method for casting pots in 'greensand' moulds, previously only used for smaller castings. This enabled pots and cauldrons to be mass-produced and to be thinner than those made by the traditional process of casting in loam moulds. For this purpose, he established the Cheese Lane Foundry in 1704. Initially he cast brass pots, but by 1705, he moved on to using iron. A young Welsh apprentice, John Thomas, solved the problem by using sand for the mould, with a special casting box and core. Using this casting method Darby could cast pots of sufficient thinness and lightness. Darby took out a patent on the new casting method in 1707, Darby's successors sold cooking pots over wide areas of England and Wales, and had a virtual monopoly in the trade. For this he used a reverberatory air furnace of a kind developed by Sir Clement Clerke, initially for smelting lead near Bristol, and applied by him or his son Talbot to iron founding at Vauxhall.

Darby's interest in iron casting was not shared by his partners, who were not interested in expanding the Bristol Brass Company. he drew his money out of the Bristol Brassworks and on hearing of Coalbrookdale went and settled there.

== Copper at Coalbrookdale ==
In 1700, another group of Bristol Quakers (including Edward Lloyd and Charles Harford) had agreed to set up a brass works 'somewhere in England'. It is not clear where, but by 1712, Caleb Lloyd, Jeffrey Pinnell, Abraham Darby and his brother-in-law Thomas Harvey had brass works at Coalbrookdale. This is likely to be linked to an increase in shipment of 'Callumy' (Calamine) up the river Severn from 1704 and Darby's agreement in 1710 to open a copper mine at Harmer Hill in Myddle, on behalf of a 'Company of the City of Bristol'. However, Darby was not a partner in establishing Tern Mill, near Tern Hall (now Attingham Park) in 1709, though his partners Thomas Harvey, Lloyd and Pinnell were. At this point Darby decided to leave the brass company and concentrate on his iron founding pursuits.

== Coalbrookdale furnace ==
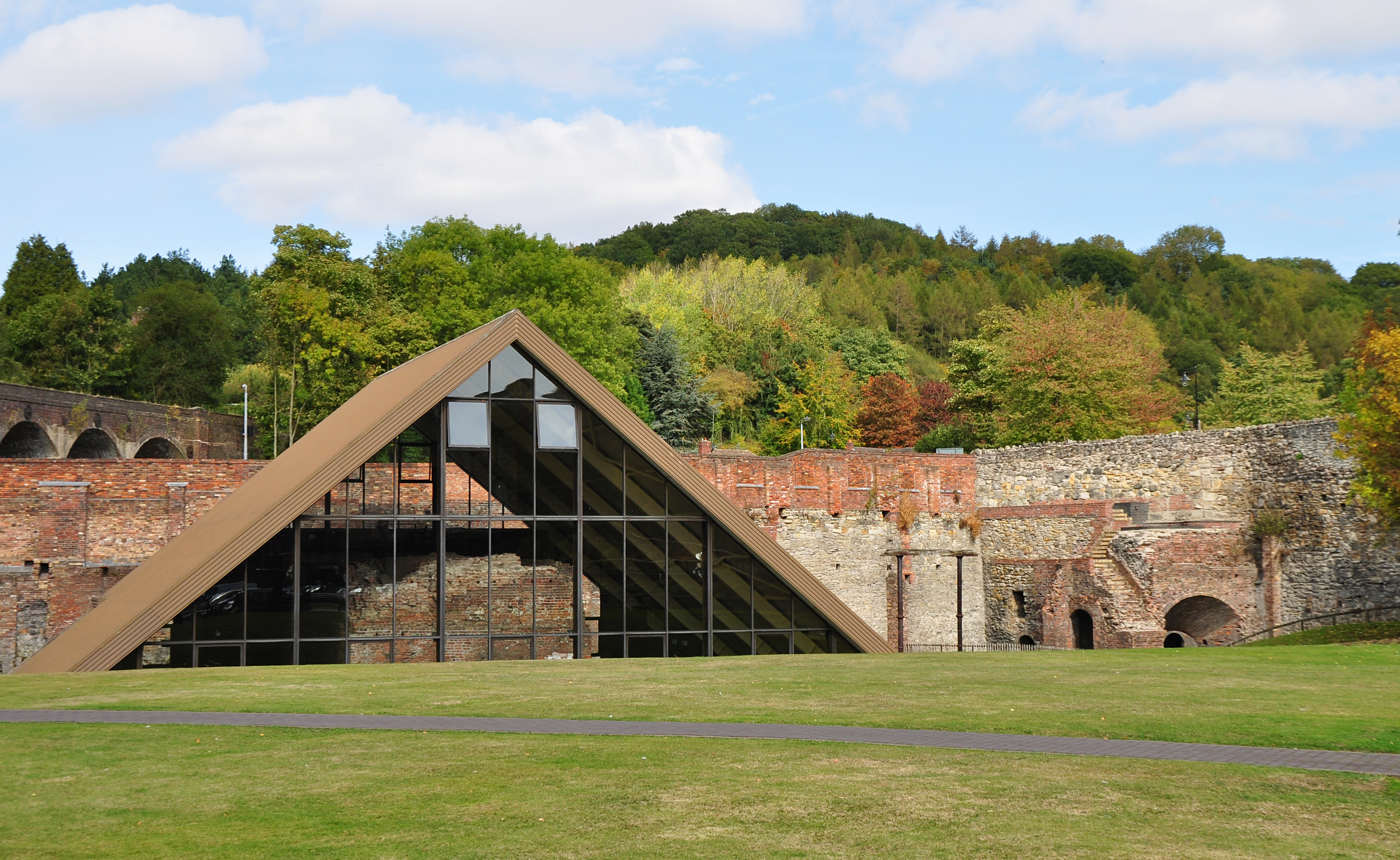
Darby's blast furnace, now part of the Coalbrookdale Museum of Iron

Darby leased the furnace in September 1708, and set to work preparing to get it into blast. His first account book, running from 20 October 1708 to 4 January 1710 survives. This shows the production of 'charked' coal in January 1709 and the furnace was brought into blast on 10 January. Darby sold 81 tons of iron goods that year.

The furnace was used for the first time on 10 January 1709 and the blast appears to have been successful. Darby was probably helped by the fact that the Shropshire 'clod coal' that he was using was fairly sulphur-free. However, experimentation with different fuels continued for some time; for example cargoes of coal were brought up the Severn from Bristol and Neath. Some of the molten iron from the blast was run into pigs and sent down the Severn for use in Bristol foundries, but much of it was used to cast pots and other cast iron goods.

The reasons why the iron produced by Darby was not used in forges to make wrought iron have been much debated. The reason may be partly that his pig iron was better for castings than charcoal pig iron, but the presence of silicon as an impurity made it an unattractive feedstock for finery forges. However recent work has thrown doubt on this explanation, which is based on data from the 1720s when the Coalbrookdale Company operated a forge: the forge could hardly even make a profit with charcoal pit iron.

The business was partly financed by a loan from Thomas Goldney II of Bristol and by Graffin Prankard and James Peters becoming partners. Later John Chamberlayne became a partner, and Darby's brother-in-law Thomas Baylies a manager.

== Expansion ==
In 1712, Darby offered to instruct William Rawlinson, a fellow Quaker and ironmaster, in the techniques of smelting with coke. Apparently, Rawlinson, the founder of the Backbarrow Iron Company in Furness, did not take up the offer.

In 1714, Darby and his partners renewed their lease (effective from 1717) and then built a second blast furnace. This was slightly more productive in the 1720s than the Old Blast Furnace. It is not clear when this furnace began production but it was certainly in use by 1718.

The company also secured Vale Royal Furnace in central Cheshire, but this did not come into their possession before Abraham Darby's death. Afterward, it was taken over by Thomas Baylies with other partners.

The Company embarked on a similar venture at Dolgûn, near Dolgellau, where John Kelsall was appointed as clerk, but it is probable that the furnace there was not finished until after Darby died, when his widow and the other partners sold off their lease.

== Death ==
After 18 months' illness, Abraham Darby died on 5 May 1717, at his home, Madeley Court, Madeley, Shropshire, aged 40. He had built a house for himself in Coalbrookdale but did not live to occupy it. He was buried in the Quaker burial-ground at Broseley, Shropshire. His widow died only a few months later.

== New company ==
Darby's death left the affairs of the business in a mess. His own shares were mortgaged to Thomas Goldney, who then exchanged the debt for eight shares (of 16) in the business. Richard Ford, who married Abraham's daughter Mary, had two shares and became manager, but on the widow's death Thomas Baylies took out letters of administration as a creditor and sought to sell the works. Darby's eldest son, Abraham Darby II, was only six years old and his two brothers younger still. Accordingly, their uncle Joshua Sergeant bought back some of the shares on behalf of the Darby children. The children were sent away to school, and Abraham II began assisting in the management of the works in 1728 and he was awarded four shares in the company in 1732.

== Legacy ==
Abraham Darby made an important step towards the Industrial Revolution. His method of casting pots in sand provided his successors with a viable business that operated for over two centuries.

Smelting iron with coke ultimately released the iron industry from the limitation imposed by the preliminary step of "charcoal burning" where trees were first cut and burned to make charcoal. It also shifted the fuel used for making steel from renewable wood, to a fossil fuel, and so helped preserve native woodland. Coke-smelted cast iron went into steam engines, bridges, and many of the inventions of the 19th century. Coke smelting made possible the great quantities of iron produced which drove the Industrial Revolution.

The Abraham Darby room at Friends House, London, UK is named after him.

== See also ==
- Abraham Darby II
- Abraham Darby III
