= John Bellers =

English Quaker and educator (1654–1725)

John Bellers (1654 – 8 February 1725) was an English educational theorist and Quaker, author of Proposals for Raising a College of Industry of All Useful Trades and Husbandry (1695).

== Life ==
Bellers was born in London, the son of the Quaker Francis Bellers and Mary Read. Unable to attend a university or join a profession as a result of his religion, John was educated as an apprentice cloth merchant. He rapidly became active in meetings and in the Quaker community as a whole, purchasing 10,000 acres (40 km^{2}) of land in Pennsylvania in 1685 for Huguenot refugees and for many other purposes. William Penn was a close friend. He married a fellow Quaker, Frances Fettiplace, in 1686, and they had six children between the years 1687 and 1695, although one died shortly after birth. From 1695 to his death in 1725, he was continually involved in writing innovative articles on social issues, including education, health sector, care for the poor, support for refugees, a plan for a European state, and an argument for the abolition of capital punishment, which means punishment due to slavery, making him "the first European advocate of the abolition of capital punishment". He became a Fellow of the Royal Society in February 1719.

On his death in London in 1725 he was buried in the Quaker Burying Ground, Bunhill Fields. His son Fettiplace Bellers (1687–1750) was a dramatist and philosophical writer.

== Proposals for Raising a College of Industry ==
Bellers' essay Proposals for Raising a College of Industry of All Useful Trades and Husbandry, published in 1695, advocates the establishment of a "College of Industry", a self-sufficient co-operative settlement for the poor – those who depend on their work or on charity for their living. Bellers argued that it was in the responsibility of the rich to take care of the poor and their education.

Bellers dedicated the first edition to his fellow Quakers, although the college was to be a civil fellowship rather than a religious one. The first edition of the tract ends with an appeal for funding – "An Epistle to Friends Concerning the education of Children" – in favour of the college, signed by about forty-five leading Quakers. They included William Penn, Robert Barclay, Thomas Ellwood, John Hodgskin, Leonard Fell and Charles Marshall. The second edition (1696) was dedicated to Parliament. His influence can be seen in two subsequent establishments set up by the Quakers. The first Quaker workhouse was at Bristol, founded in 1696. The second Quaker workhouse at Clerkenwell was established in 1702 as a result of his efforts.

The combination of agriculture and manufacture would enable self-sufficiency and even profit. Bellers argued that if all "the present idle hands of the poor of this nation" were put to work, it would bring England "as much treasure as the mines give to Spain".

The plans for the education of children at the college were ahead of their time. Practice and experience were to be valued over learning through dictation. Bellers created the combination of learning and work as a way of preventing idleness. Karl Marx mentions Bellers for the first time in Chapter 13 of Das Kapital, in one of the notes, where Marx consider Bellers "a real phenomenon in the History of Political Economy." Later, in Chapter 25, quoting Bellers' argument that "the labour of the poor is the mines of the rich". Bellers is also quoted in a footnote in Chapter 23 of the book; "Labour is as proper for the body's health as eating is for its living [...] Labour adds oil to the lamp of life when thinking inflames it".

Robert Owen read the proposals in 1817, and in a letter to The Times acknowledged their resemblance to the community he himself had created at New Lanark. He had 1,000 copies reprinted that year. Eduard Bernstein saw Bellers as a precursor of socialism, if not communism, highlighting his argument for valuing goods according to labour, not money.

== About the Improvement of Physick ==
In About the Improvement of Physick, published in 1714, Bellers advocated a national system of hospitals, which were to treat the poor and act as training schools for new doctors. Eduard Bernstein saw in this essay an anticipation of a national health service.

== Legacy and Influence ==
Bellers' proposals for integrating work, living and education became core to Quaker social reform. Historians of the Garden City Movement see the College of Industry as an early starter to the model villages of the 19th and 20th century like Cadbury's Bournville and Rowntrees's New Earswick. These changed the self contained communal model to suburban garden villages, while sharing Bellers' principle that environmental and housing reform were needed to alleviate structural poverty.

== Works ==
- Proposals for Raising a College of Industry of All Useful Trades and Husbandry (1696)
- Essays about the poor, Manufactures, Trade, Plantations and Immorality, and of the Excellency and Divinity of Inward Light (1699)
- Some Reasons for an European State proposed to the Powers of Europe... (1710)
- An Essay towards the Ease of Elections of Members of Parliament (1712)
- About the Improvement of Physick (1714)
- An Essay for Employing the Poor to Profit (1723)
- An Epistle to Friends of the Yearly, Quarterly, and Monthly Meetings (1724)
- An abstract of George Fox's Advice and Warning To the Magistrates of London in the year 1657... (1724)
