= Coalbrookdale =

Settlement in Shropshire, England

Coordinates: 52.639°N 2.492°W

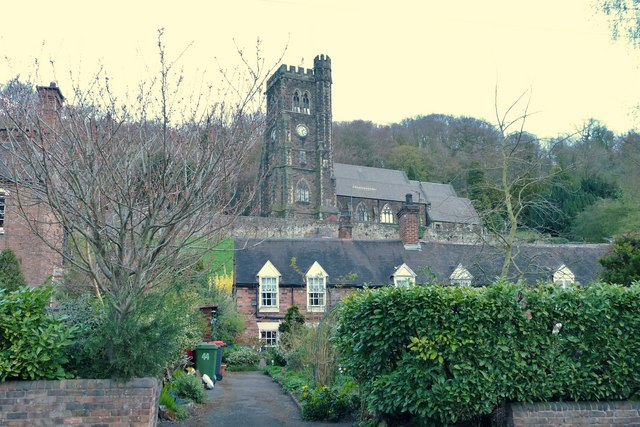
- Holy Trinity Church and townscape

- Location within Shropshire
- Population: (Ironbridge Gorge)
- OS grid reference: SJ668047
- Civil parish: The Gorge
- Unitary authority: Telford and Wrekin
- Ceremonial county: Shropshire
- Region: West Midlands
- Country: England
- Sovereign state: United Kingdom
- Post town: TELFORD
- Postcode district: TF8
- Dialling code: 01952
- Police: West Mercia
- Fire: Shropshire
- Ambulance: West Midlands
- UK Parliament: Telford

Coalbrookdale is a settlement in the Ironbridge Gorge and the Telford and Wrekin borough of Shropshire, England, of great significance in the history of iron ore smelting. It lies within the civil parish called The Gorge, and is sometimes referred to as a town.

This is where iron ore was first smelted by Abraham Darby using easily mined "coking coal". The coal was drawn from drift mines in the sides of the valley. As it contained far fewer impurities than normal coal, the iron it produced was of a superior quality. Along with many other industrial developments that were going on in other parts of the country, this discovery was a major factor in the growing industrialisation of Britain, which was to become known as the Industrial Revolution. Today, Coalbrookdale is home to the Ironbridge Institute, a partnership between the University of Birmingham and the Ironbridge Gorge Museum Trust offering postgraduate and professional development courses in heritage.

== Before Abraham Darby ==
Before the Dissolution of the Monasteries, Madeley and the adjacent Little Wenlock belonged to Much Wenlock Priory. At the Dissolution there was a bloomsmithy called "Caldebroke Smithy". The manor passed about 1572 to John Brooke, who developed coal mining in his manor on a substantial scale. His son Sir Basil Brooke was a significant industrialist, and invested in ironworks elsewhere. It is probable that he also had ironworks at Coalbrookdale, but evidence is lacking. He also acquired an interest in the patent for the cementation process of making steel in about 1615. Though forced to surrender the patent in 1619, he continued making iron and steel until his estate was sequestrated during the Civil War, but the works continued in use.

In 1651, the manor was leased to Francis Wolfe, the clerk of the ironworks, and he and his son operated them as tenant of (or possibly manager for) Brooke's heirs. The surviving old blast furnace contains a cast-iron lintel bearing a date, which is currently painted as 1638, but an archive photograph has been found showing it as 1658. What ironworks existed at Coalbrookdale and from precisely what dates thus remains obscure. By 1688, the ironworks were operated by Lawrence Wellington, but a few years after the furnace was occupied by Shadrach Fox. He renewed the lease in 1696, letting the Great Forge and Plate Forge to Wellington. Some evidence may suggest that Shadrach Fox smelted iron with mineral coal, though this remains controversial. Fox was evidently an iron founder, as he supplied round shot and grenade shells to the Board of Ordnance during the Nine Years War, but not later than April 1703, the furnace blew up. It remained derelict until the arrival of Abraham Darby the Elder in 1709. However the forges remained in use. A brass works was built sometime before 1712 (possibly as early as 1706), but closed in 1714.

== Industrial Revolution ==
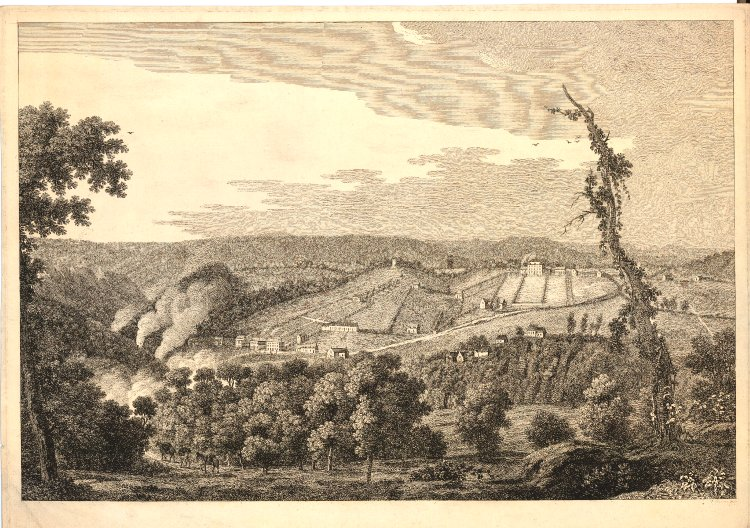
Coalbrookdale in 1758

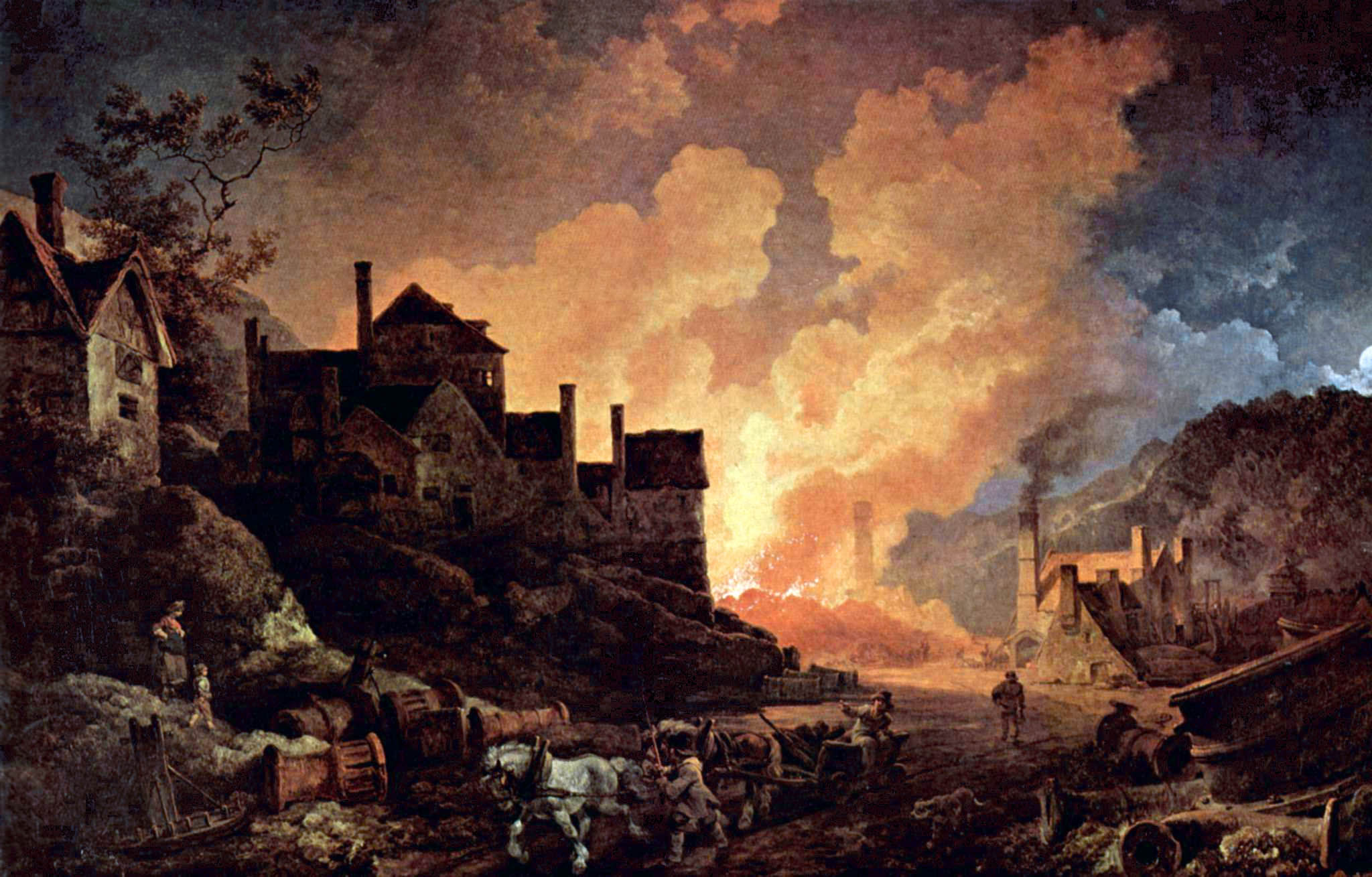
Coalbrookdale by Night, painted 1801 by Philip James de Loutherbourg, The Madeley wood furnaces, Madeley Wood Company

In 1709, the first Abraham Darby rebuilt Coalbrookdale Furnace, and eventually used coke as his fuel. His business was that of an ironfounder, making cast-iron pots and other goods, an activity in which he was particularly successful because of his patented foundry method, which enabled him to produce cheaper pots than his rivals. Coalbrookdale has been claimed as the home of the world's first coke-fired blast furnace; this is not strictly correct, but it was the first in Europe to operate successfully for more than a few years.

The housing and community welfare practices seen at Coalbrookdale were rooted in early Quaker experiments with industrial social care. Abraham Darby had lived in Bristol during the opening decade of the 18th century, where he participated in the tightly family and industrial integrated network created and administered the Bristol Quaker Workhouse. Established in 1696 following John Bellers' College of Industry, gave a practical example how Quakers could combine industrial production, religion with community welfare. During the first century of the works, Friends meetings were held not only on Sunday but on weekdays as well, and for a long time these meetings were held in the offices, in the Dabrby's house, or later in the meeting house built by Darby II

Darby renewed his lease of the works in 1714, forming a new partnership with John Chamberlain and Thomas Baylies. They built a second furnace in about 1715, which was intended to be followed up with a furnace in Wales at Dolgûn near Dolgellau and in Cheshire taking over Vale Royal Furnace in 1718. However, Darby died prematurely at Madeley Court in 1717 – the same year as he began the house Dale End which became home to succeeding generations of the family in Coalbrookdale – followed quickly by his widow Mary. The partnership was dissolved before Mary's death, Baylies taking over Vale Royal. After Mary's death, Baylies had difficulty extracting his capital. The works then passed to a company led by his fellow Quaker Thomas Goldney II of Bristol and managed by Richard Ford (also a Quaker). Darby's son Abraham Darby the Younger was brought into the business as an assistant manager when old enough.

The company's main business was producing cast-iron goods. Molten iron for this foundry work was not only produced from the blast furnaces, but also by remelting pig iron in air furnaces, a variant of the reverberatory furnace. The Company also became early suppliers of cylinders for Newcomen atmospheric engines from 1723, with upgraded boring facilities in 1734 allowing them to bore larger cylinders reaching 60 inches diameter by 1748 and later 70 inch diameter. They installed their own Newcomen engine in 1743 as a water-returning engine, which could be used when the water supply was low to pump water from below the waterwheel to the pond above it.

From 1720, the Company operated a forge at Coalbrookdale but this was not profitable. In about 1754, renewed experiments took place with the application of coke pig iron to the production of bar iron in charcoal finery forges. This proved to be a success, and led to the partners building new furnaces at Horsehay and Ketley. This was the beginning of a great expansion in coke ironmaking.

In 1767, the Company began to produce the first cast-iron rails for railways. In 1778, Abraham Darby III undertook the building of the world's first cast-iron bridge, the iconic Iron Bridge, opened 1 January 1781. The fame of this bridge leads many people today to associate the iron-making part of the Industrial Revolution with the neighbouring village of Ironbridge, but in fact most of the work was done at Coalbrookdale, as there was no settlement at Ironbridge in the eighteenth century. Expansion of Coalbrookdale's industrial facilities continued, with the development of sophisticated ponds and culverts to provide water power, and in 1781 a beam engine Resolution, replaced the earlier Newcomen water-returning engine. This was still an atmospheric engine perating on the Newcomen principle, but it had a separate condenser as per James Watt's patent, and so was more efficient.

In 1795, the first porcelain factory near Coalbrookdale was founded at Coalport, east of the Iron Bridge, by William Reynolds and John Rose, producing Coalport porcelain.

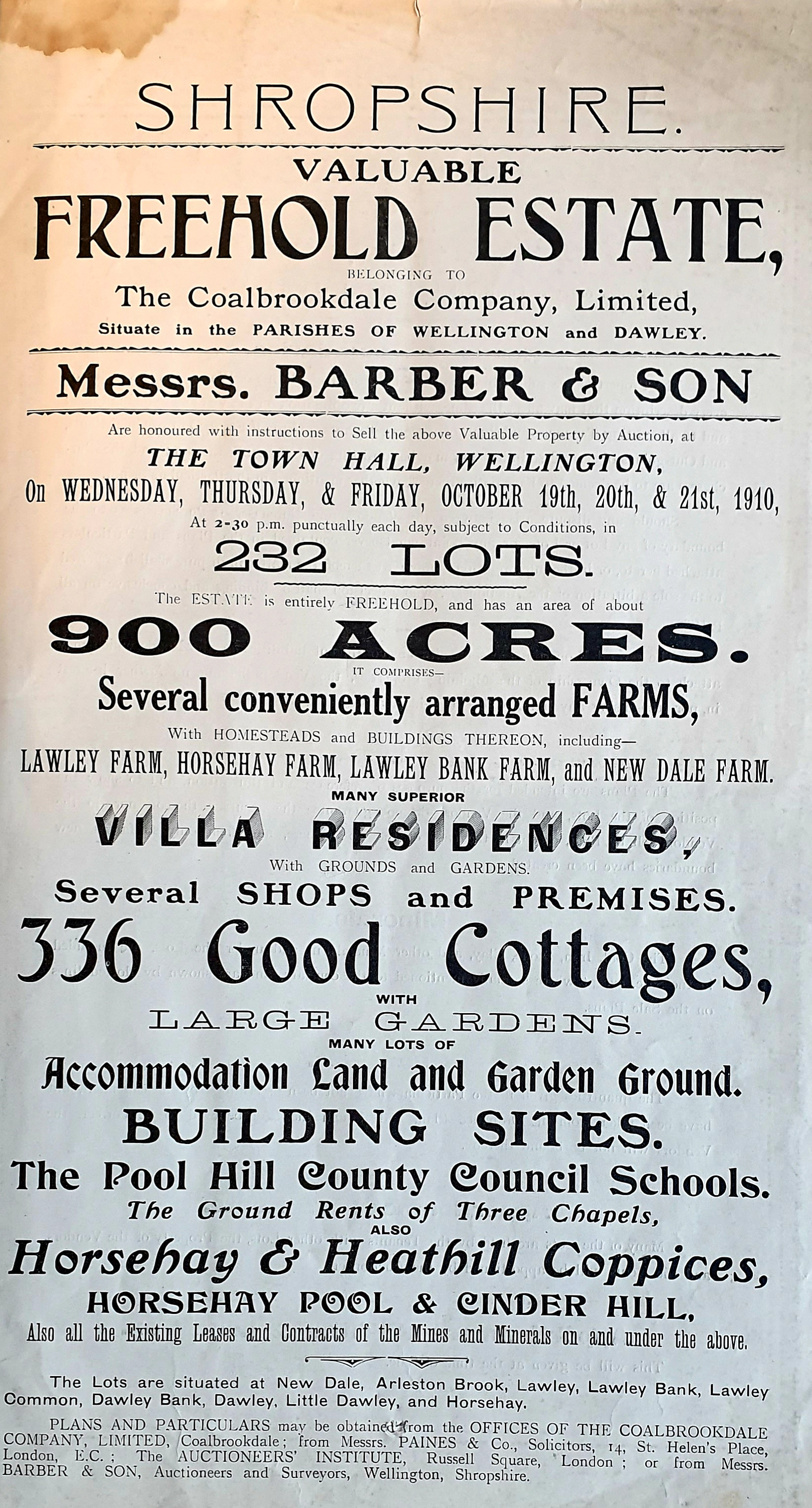
Coalbrookdale Company auction poster, issued in 1910

Coalbrookdale Company No 5 at Enginuity

In 1802, the Coalbrookdale Company built a rail locomotive for Richard Trevethick, but little is known about it, including whether or not it actually ran. The death of a company workman in an accident involving the engine is said to have caused the company to not proceed to running it on their existing railway. To date, the only known information about it comes from a drawing preserved at the Science Museum, London, together with a letter written by Trevithick to his friend Davies Giddy. The design incorporated a single horizontal cylinder enclosed in a return-flue boiler. A flywheel drove the wheels on one side through spur gears, and the axles were mounted directly on the boiler, with no frame. The drawing indicates that the locomotive ran on a plateway with a track gauge of 3 ft (914 mm). This was two years before Trevethick's first engine to tow a train was run at Penydarren in south Wales. In the mid-19th century, the Company was a major backer of the Wellington and Severn Junction Railway (built between 1857 and 1861). In 1860 they produced the castings for the 200-foot Victorial Bridge, at the time of its construction the longest single span cast iron bridge in Britain. Around 1864 they built six 0-4-0ST standard gauge saddle tank locomotives, one of which is preserved at Enginuity.

In the 19th century, Coalbrookdale was noted for its decorative ironwork. It is here (for example) that the gates of London's Hyde Park were built. Other examples include the Coalbrookdale verandah at St John's in Monmouth, Wales, and as far away as the Peacock Fountain in Christchurch, New Zealand. The blast furnaces were closed down, perhaps as early as the 1820s, but the foundries remained in use. The Coalbrookdale Company became part of an alliance of ironfounding companies called Light Castings Limited. This was absorbed by Allied Ironfounders Limited in 1929. This was in turn taken over by Glynwed which has since become Aga Foodservice. The Coalbrookdale foundry closed in November 2017.

Several of Coalbrookdale's industrial heritage sites are to be found on the local trail: including: Coalbrookdale railway station, the Quaker Burial Ground, the Darby Houses, Tea Kettle Row and the Great Western Railway Viaduct.

== Museum ==
In the century after the Old Blast Furnace closed, it became buried. There was a proposal for the site to be cleared and the furnace dismantled, but instead, it was decided to excavate and preserve it. It and a small museum were opened to celebrate 250 years of the Company in 1959. This became part of a larger project, the Ironbridge Gorge Museums. Its Museum of Iron is based in the Great Warehouse constructed in 1838 and Ironbridge Institute is based in the Long Warehouse, these two form the sides of an open space. On another side of which is the Old Blast Furnace, now under a building (erected in 1981) to protect it from the weather. The fourth side is a viaduct carrying the railway that delivered coal to the now demolished Ironbridge Power Station. One of the two tracks is due to be taken over by Telford Steam Railway as part of its southern extension from Horsehay. The Museum's archaeology unit continues to investigate the earlier history of Coalbrookdale, and has recently excavated the remains of the 17th century cementation furnaces, near the site of the Upper (formerly Middle) Forge.

== Old Furnace ==
The Old Furnace began life as a typical blast furnace of the time, using charcoal as fuel and with the blast provided by a waterwheel operating bellows, but went over to coke as a fuel in 1709. Abraham Darby I used it to cast pots, kettles and other goods. His grandson Abraham Darby III smelted the iron here for the first Ironbridge, the world's first iron bridge.

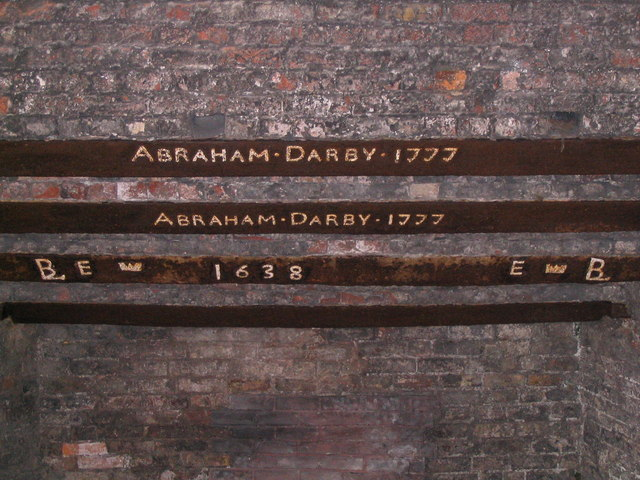
The lintels of the Old Furnace, with inscriptions

The lintels of the furnace bear dated inscriptions. The uppermost reads "Abraham Darby 1777", probably recording its enlargement for casting the Iron Bridge. It is unclear whether the date on one of the lower ones should be 1638 (as it is now painted) or 1658 (as shown on an old photo). The interior profile of the furnace is typical of its period, bulging around the middle, below which the boshes taper in again so that the charge descends into a narrower and hotter hearth, where the iron was molten. When Abraham Darby III enlarged the furnace, he only made the boshes wider on the front and left sides, but not on the right where doing so would have entailed moving the water wheel. The mouth of the furnace is thus off-centre.

Iron was now being made in large quantities for many customers. In the 1720s and 1730s, its main products were cast-iron cooking pots, kettles and other domestic articles. It also cast the cylinders for steam engines, and pig iron for use by other foundries. In the late 18th century, it sometimes produced structural ironwork, including for Buildwas Bridge. This was built in 1796, 2 miles up the river from the original Ironbridge. Due to advances in technology, it used only half as much cast iron despite being 30 feet (9 m) wider than the Ironbridge. The year after that, in 1796, Thomas Telford began a new project, Longdon-on-Tern Aqueduct. It carried the Shrewsbury Canal over the River Tern and was supported by cast-iron columns. Charles Bage designed and built the world's first multi-storey cast-iron-framed mill in Ditherington, Shrewsbury. It used only brick and iron, with no wood, to improve its fire-resistance. In the 19th century ornamental ironwork became a speciality.

== Notable people ==
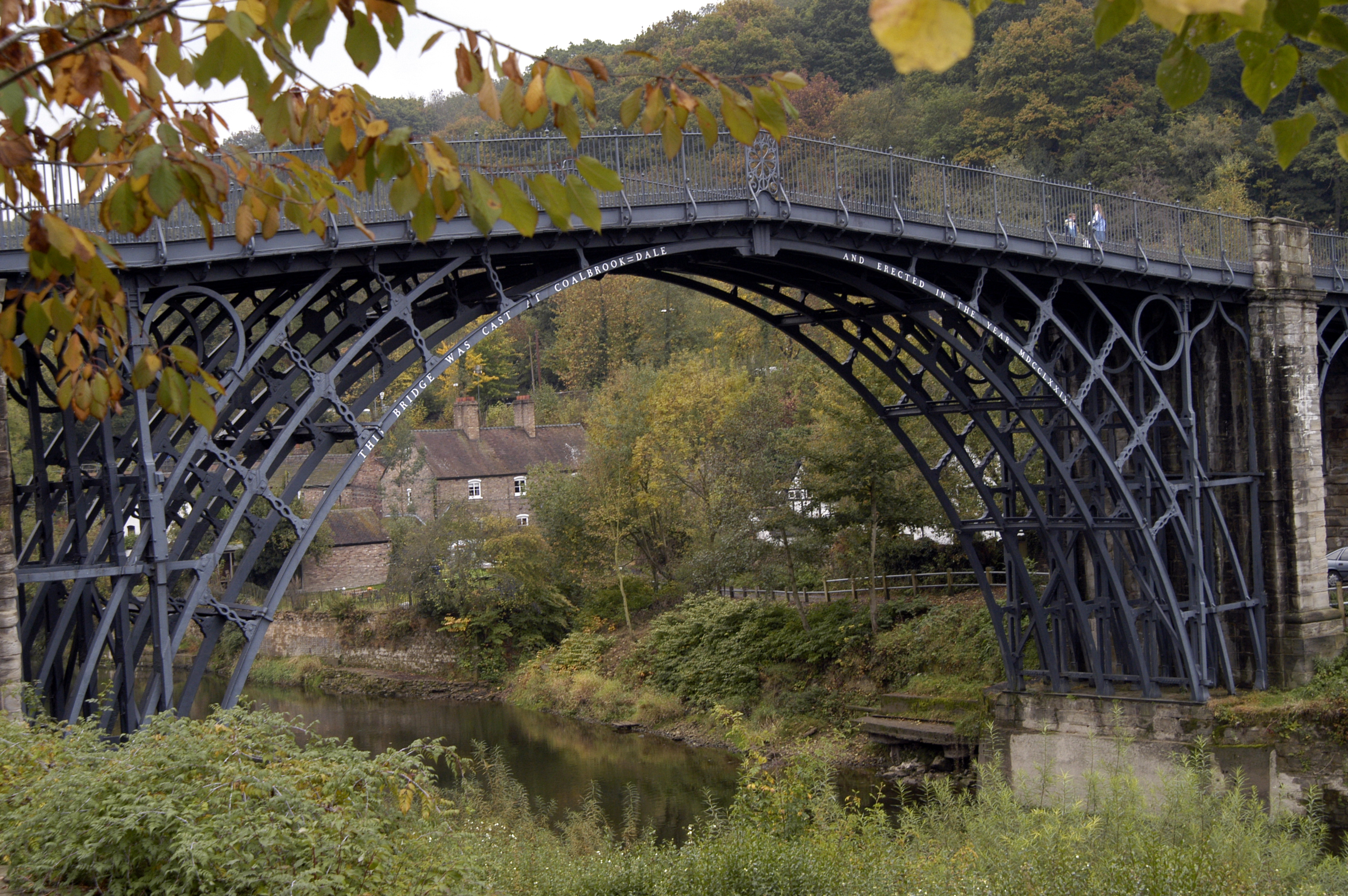
Ironbridge

- Abraham Darby II (1711–1763), ironmaster,
- Abiah Darby (1716–1794), minister in the Quaker church, wife of the above.
- Abraham Darby III (1750–1794), ironmaster.
- Abraham Darby IV (1804–1878), ironmaster.
- William Reynolds (1758–1803), an ironmaster and a partner in the local ironworks
- Thomas Parker FRSE (1843–1915), an electrical engineer, inventor and industrialist.
- Arthur Charles Fox-Davies (1871–1928), writer and heraldic expert, brought up locally
- Rowsby Woof (1883–1943), violinist and music educator.

== See also ==
- Ironbridge Gorge Museums
- Green Wood Centre
- Resolution
- Listed buildings in The Gorge
- Holy Trinity Church, Coalbrookdale
