= Abraham Darby II =

English ironmaster and Quaker (1711–1763)

Abraham Darby
- Born: 12 May 1711; Coalbrookdale, England, Great Britain
- Died: 31 March 1763 (aged 51)
- Spouses: Margaret Smith (died 1740) Abiah Maude
- Children: Hannah, Abraham, and 14 others
- Parent(s): Abraham Darby; Mary Sergeant

Abraham Darby, in his lifetime called Abraham Darby the Younger, referred to for convenience as Abraham Darby II (12 May 1711 – 31 March 1763) was the second man of that name in an English Quaker family that played an important role in the early years of the Industrial Revolution.

== Life ==
Darby was born in Coalbrookdale, Shropshire to Abraham and Mary (née Sergeant).

He followed in his father's footsteps in the Darby foundry business in Coalbrookdale, producing cast iron cooking pots, kettles, and other goods. The Coalbrookdale Company also played an important role in using iron to replace the more expensive brass for cylinders for Thomas Newcomen's steam engines.

He and his partners were responsible for a very important innovation in introducing the use of coke pig iron as the feedstock for finery forges. This formed a significant part of the output of Horsehay and Ketley Furnaces, which they built in the late 1750s. His father's successful use of coke pig iron as foundry feedstock, and his own success in using it as forge feedstock were two of the steps towards the industrial revolution for the iron industry, but the final breakthrough that permitted the great expansion of iron production that constitutes the industrial revolution for it came later.

He died aged 51. He had married twice: firstly Margaret Smith (died 1740), with whom he had three children including Hannah who married Richard Reynolds, and secondly the Quaker minister Abiah Maude, with whom he had a further 13 children although only four including Abraham Darby III survived.

== Ancestry ==
Ancestors of Abraham Darby II

John Darby
Abraham Darby
Ann Baylies
Abraham Darby
Mary Sergeant

== See also ==
- Abraham Darby I
- Abraham Darby III
- Abraham Darby IV
