= Joseph Hall (metallurgist) =

Joseph Hall (1789–1862), the inventor of 'Wet Puddling', was born in 1789 and apprenticed in 1806 as a puddler to use Henry Cort's puddling process. He tried adding old iron to the charge of the puddling furnace and later puddler's bosh cinder (iron scale, that is rust) to the charge. This caused the charge (to his surprise) to boil violently. When this subsided he gathered the iron into a puddle ball in the usual way, and this proved to be good iron.

In 1830, with the financial support of others he established the Bloomfield Ironworks at Tipton, the firm becoming Bailey, Barrows and Hall in 1834. In 1838, he patented the use of 'bulldog' (roasted tap cinder) to protect the iron bottom plate of the puddling furnace (Patent no.7778 21 August 1838). In 1849, he moved to small house at Handsworth but continued to visit the works occasionally. He died there in 1862.
