= Puddling (metallurgy) =

Step in the manufacture of iron

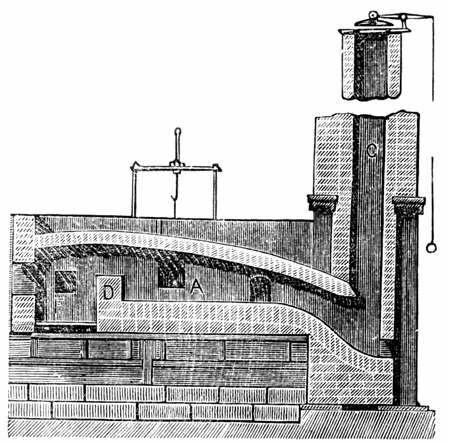
Schematic drawing of a puddling furnace

Puddling is the process of converting pig iron to bar (wrought) iron in a coal fired reverberatory furnace. It was developed in England during the 1780s. The molten pig iron was stirred in a reverberatory furnace, in an oxidizing environment to burn the carbon, resulting in wrought iron. It was one of the most important processes for making the first appreciable volumes of valuable and useful bar iron (malleable wrought iron) without the use of charcoal. Eventually, the furnace would be used to make small quantities of specialty steels.

Though it was not the first process to produce bar iron without charcoal, puddling was by far the most successful, and replaced the earlier potting and stamping processes, as well as the much older charcoal finery and bloomery processes. This enabled a great expansion of iron production to take place in Great Britain, and shortly afterwards, in North America. That expansion constitutes the beginnings of the Industrial Revolution so far as the iron industry is concerned. Most 19th century applications of wrought iron, including the Eiffel Tower, bridges, and the original framework of the Statue of Liberty, used puddled iron.

== History ==
Modern puddling was one of several processes developed in the second half of the 18th century in Great Britain for producing bar iron from pig iron without the use of charcoal. It gradually replaced the earlier charcoal-fueled process, conducted in a finery forge.

=== The need for puddling ===
Pig iron contains much free carbon and is brittle. Before it can be used, and before it can be worked by a blacksmith, it must be converted to a more malleable form as bar iron, the early stage of wrought iron.

Abraham Darby's successful use of coke for his blast furnace at Coalbrookdale in 1709 reduced the price of iron, but this coke-fuelled pig iron was not initially accepted as it could not be converted to bar iron by the existing methods. Sulfur impurities from the coke made it 'red short', or brittle when heated, and so the finery process was unworkable for it. It was not until around 1750, when steam powered blowing increased furnace temperatures enough to allow sufficient lime to be added to remove the sulfur, that coke pig iron began to be adopted. Also, better processes were developed to refine it.

=== Invention ===
Abraham Darby II, son of the blast furnace innovator, managed to convert pig iron to bar iron in 1749, but no details are known of his process. The Cranage brothers, also working alongside the River Severn, allegedly achieved this experimentally by using a coal-fired reverbatory furnace, in which the iron and the sulphurous coal could be kept separate but it was never used commercially. They were the first to hypothesise that iron could be converted from pig iron to bar iron by the action of heat alone. Although they were unaware of the necessary effects of the oxygen supplied by the air, they had at least abandoned the previous misapprehension that mixture with materials from the fuel were needed. Their experiments were successful and they were granted patent Nº851 in 1766, but no commercial adoption seems to have been made of their process.

In 1783, Peter Onions at Dowlais constructed a larger reverbatory furnace. He began successful commercial puddling with this and was granted patent Nº1370. The furnace was improved by Henry Cort at Fontley in Hampshire in 1783–84 and patented in 1784. Cort added dampers to the chimney, avoiding some of the risk of overheating and 'burning' the iron. Cort's process consisted of stirring molten pig iron in a reverberatory furnace in an oxidising atmosphere, thus decarburising it. When the iron "came to nature", that is, to a pasty consistency, it was gathered into a puddled ball, shingled, and rolled (as described below). This application of grooved rollers to the rolling mill, to roll narrow bars, was also Cort's adoption of existing rolling mills on the Continent. Cort's efforts to license this process were unsuccessful as it only worked with charcoal smelted pig iron. Modifications were made by Richard Crawshay at his ironworks at Cyfarthfa in Merthyr Tydfil, which incorporated an initial refining process developed at their neighbours at Dowlais.

Ninety years after Cort's invention, an American labor newspaper recalled the advantages of his system:

"When iron is simply melted and run into any mold, its texture is granular, and it is so brittle as to be quite unreliable for any use requiring much tensile strength. The process of puddling consisted in stirring the molten iron run out in a puddle, and had the effect of so changing its anotomic arrangement as to render the process of rolling more efficacious."

Cort's process (as patented) only worked for white cast iron, not grey cast iron, which was the usual feedstock for forges of the period. This problem was resolved probably at Merthyr Tydfil by combining puddling with one element of a slightly earlier process. This involved another kind of hearth known as a 'refinery' or 'running out fire'. The pig iron was melted in this and run out into a trough. The slag separated, and floated on the molten iron, and was removed by lowering a dam at the end of the trough. The effect of this process was to desiliconise the metal, leaving a white brittle metal, known as 'finers metal'. This was the ideal material to charge to the puddling furnace. This version of the process was known as 'dry puddling' and continued in use in some places as late as 1890.

An additional development in refining gray iron was known as 'wet puddling', also known as 'boiling' or 'pig boiling'. This was invented by a puddler named Joseph Hall at Tipton. He began adding scrap iron to the charge. Later, he tried adding iron scale (in effect, iron oxides such as FeO, Fe_{2}O_{3}, or Fe_{3}O_{4}). The result was spectacular in that the furnace boiled violently, producing carbon monoxide bubbles. This was due to a chemical reaction between the iron oxides in the scale and the carbon dissolved in the pig iron: C + Fe_{2}O_{3} → CO + 2 FeO. To his surprise, the resultant puddle ball produced good iron.

One big problem with puddling was that up to 15% of the iron was drawn off with the slag because sand was used for the bed. Hall substituted roasted tap cinder for the bed, which cut this waste to 8%, declining to 5% by the end of the century.

Hall subsequently became a partner in establishing the Bloomfield Iron Works at Tipton in 1830, the firm becoming Bradley, Barrows and Hall from 1834. This is the version of the process most commonly used in the mid to late 19th century. Wet puddling had the advantage that it was much more efficient than dry puddling (or any earlier process). The best yield of iron achievable from dry puddling is one ton of iron from 1.3 tons of pig iron (a yield of 77%), but the yield from wet puddling was nearly 100%.

The production of mild steel in the puddling furnace was achieved circa 1850 in Westphalia, Germany and was patented in Great Britain on behalf of Lohage, Bremme and Lehrkind. It worked only with pig iron made from certain kinds of ore. The cast iron had to be melted quickly and the slag to be rich in manganese. When the metal came to nature, it had to be removed quickly and shingled before further decarburization occurred. The process was taken up at the Low Moor Ironworks at Bradford in Yorkshire (England) in 1851 and in the Loire valley in France in 1855. It was widely used.

Evolution of the production of wrough (puddled) iron, pig iron and steel in Great-Britain and France. The transition between each metal can be noticed on these graphics, for both countries.

The puddling process began to be displaced with the introduction of the Bessemer process, which produced steel. This could be converted into wrought iron using the Aston process for a fraction of the cost and time. For comparison, an average size charge for a puddling furnace was 800–900 lb (360–410 kg) while a Bessemer converter charge was 15 short tons (13,600 kg). The puddling process could not be scaled up, being limited by the amount that the puddler could handle. It could only be expanded by building more furnaces.

== Process ==
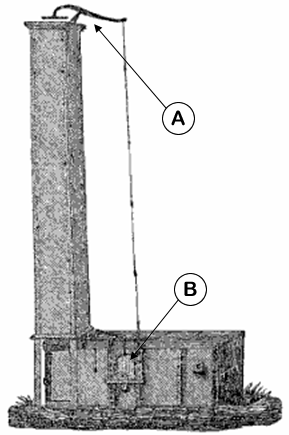
Exterior view of a single puddling furnace. A. Damper; B. Work door

The process begins by preparing the puddling furnace. This involves bringing the furnace to a low temperature and then fettling it. Fettling is the process of painting the grate and walls around it with iron oxides, typically hematite; this acts as a protective coating keeping the melted metal from burning through the furnace. Sometimes finely pounded cinder was used instead of hematite. In this case the furnace must be heated for 4–5 hours to melt the cinder and then cooled before charging.

Either white cast iron or refined iron is then placed in hearth of the furnace, a process known as charging. For wet puddling, scrap iron and/or iron oxide is also charged. This mixture is then heated until the top melts, allowing for the oxides to begin mixing; this usually takes 30 minutes. This mixture is subjected to a strong current of air and stirred by long bars with hooks on one end, called puddling bars or rabbles, through doors in the furnace. This helps the iron-III (the Fe^{3+} species acting as an oxidiser) from the oxides to react with impurities in the pig iron, notably silicon, manganese (to form slag) and to some degree sulfur and phosphorus, which form gases that escape with the exhaust of the furnace.

More fuel is then added and the temperature is raised. The iron completely melts and the carbon starts to burn off. When wet puddling, the formation of carbon monoxide (CO) and carbon dioxide (CO_{2}) due to reactions with the added iron oxide will cause bubbles to form that cause the mass to appear to boil. This process causes the slag to puff up on top, giving the puddler/rabbler a visual indication of the progress of the combustion. As the carbon burns off, the melting temperature of the mixture rises from 1,150 to 1,540 °C (2,100 to 2,800 °F), so the furnace has to be continually fed during this process. The melting point increases since the carbon atoms within the mixture act as a solute in solution which lowers the melting point of the iron mixture (like road salt on ice).

Working as a two-man crew, a puddler and helper could produce about 1500 kg of iron in a 12-hour shift. The strenuous labour, heat and fumes caused puddlers to have a very short life expectancy, with most dying in their 30s. Puddling was never able to be automated because the puddler had to sense when the balls had "come to nature".

== Puddled steel ==
In the late 1840s, the German chemist Franz Anton Lohage developed a modification of the puddling process to produce not iron but steel at the Haspe Iron Works in Hagen; it was subsequently commercialized in Germany, France and the UK in the 1850s, and puddled steel was the main raw material for Krupp cast steel even in the 1870s. Before the development of the basic refractory lining (with magnesium oxide, MgO) and the wide-scale adoption of the Gilchrist–Thomas process ca. 1880 it complemented acidic Bessemer converters (with a refractory material made of SiO_{2}) and open hearths because unlike them, the puddling furnace could utilize the phosphorus-rich ores abundant in Continental Europe.

== Puddling furnace ==
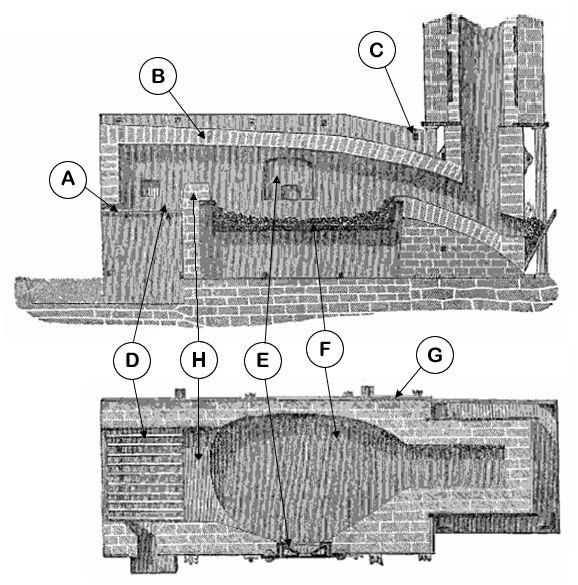
Vertical and horizontal cross-sections of a single puddling furnace. A. Fireplace grate; B. Firebricks; C. Cross binders; D. Fireplace; E. Work door; F. Hearth; G. Cast iron retaining plates; H. Bridge wall

The puddling furnace is a metalmaking technology used to create wrought iron or steel from the pig iron produced in a blast furnace. The furnace is constructed to pull the hot air over the iron without the fuel coming into direct contact with the iron, a system generally known as a reverberatory furnace or open hearth furnace. The major advantage of this system is keeping the impurities of the fuel separated from the charge.

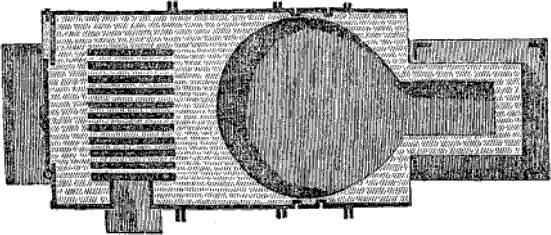
Double puddling furnace layout

The hearth is where the iron is charged, melted and puddled. The hearth's shape is usually elliptical; 1.5–1.8 m (4.9–5.9 ft) in length and 1–1.2 m (3.3–3.9 ft) wide. If the furnace is designed to puddle white iron then the hearth depth is never more than 50 cm (20 in). If the furnace is designed to boil gray iron then the average hearth depth is 50–75 cm (20–30 in).

The fireplace, where the fuel is burned, used a cast iron grate which varied in size depending on the fuel used. If bituminous coal is used then an average grate size is 60 cm × 90 cm (2.0 ft × 3.0 ft) and is loaded with 25–30 cm (9.8–11.8 in) of coal. If anthracite coal is used then the grate is 1.5 m × 1.2 m (4.9 ft × 3.9 ft) and is loaded with 50–75 cm (20–30 in) of coal. Due to the great heat required to melt the charge the grate had to be cooled, lest it melt with the charge. This was done by running a constant flow of cool air on it, or by throwing water on the bottom of the grate.

A double puddling furnace is similar to a single puddling furnace, with the major difference being there are two work doors allowing two puddlers to work the furnace at the same time. The biggest advantage of this setup is that it produces twice as much wrought iron. It is also more economical and fuel efficient compared to a single furnace.

== See also ==
- Crucible steel
- Double hammer
- Steelmaking

== Footnotes ==
Sources

- Landes, David. S. (1969). The Unbound Prometheus: Technological Change and Industrial Development in Western Europe from 1750 to the Present. Cambridge, New York: Press Syndicate of the University of Cambridge. ISBN 0-521-09418-6.
- Schubert, H.R. (1958). Extraction and Production of Metals: Iron and Steel. A History of Technology IV: The Industrial Revolution. Oxford University press.
