= Bintie =

Chinese refined iron

Bīntiě (simplified Chinese: 镔铁; traditional Chinese: 鑌鐵) was a type of refined iron, which was known for its hardness. It was often used in the making of Chinese weapons. Bintie was an important article of income in medieval Yuan China as technological advances from the preceding Song dynasty improved Yuan smelting technology. Bintie was referred to as "fine steel", due to its high carbon content.

== See also ==
- History of ferrous metallurgy
