= Double hammer =

Forging implement used in metallurgy

A double hammer is a forging implement used in metallurgy. It operates on puddle balls and blooms by hitting both sides at the same time. Double hammers are made of two blocks attached to rollers which facilitate opposing movement along a set of rails. Double hammers are normally operated by three people at a time: one holding the instrument in place and the other two moving the blocks back and forth.
