= Cranege brothers =

Thomas and George Cranege (also spelled Cranage), who worked in the ironworking industry in England in the 1760s, are notable for introducing a new method of producing wrought iron from pig iron.

== Experiment of 1766 ==
The process of converting pig iron into wrought iron (also known as bar iron) was at that time carried out in a finery forge, which was fuelled by charcoal. Charcoal was a limited resource, but coal, more widely available, could not be used because the sulphur in coal would adversely affect the quality of the wrought iron.

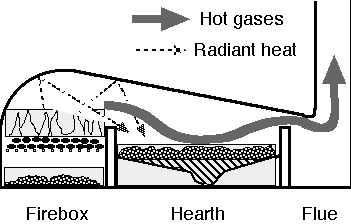
Reverbatory furnace

George Cranege worked in Coalbrookdale in Shropshire, at the ironworks established by Abraham Darby I, and his brother Thomas worked at a forge in Bridgnorth in Shropshire. They suggested to Richard Reynolds, manager of the works at Coalbrookdale, that the conversion process could be done in a reverbatory furnace, where the iron did not mix with the coal. Reynolds was sceptical, but authorized the brothers to try out the idea.

Richard Reynolds, in a letter dated 25 April 1766 to his colleague Thomas Goldney III, described his conversation with the Craneges and the experiment:

I told them, consistent with the notion I had adopted in common with all others I had conversed with, that I thought it impossible, because the vegetable salts in the charcoal being an alkali acted as an absorbent to the sulphur of the iron, which occasions the red-short quality of the iron, and pit coal abounding with sulphur would increase it.... They replied that from the observations they had made, and repeated conversations together, they were both firmly of opinion that the alteration from the quality of pig iron into that of bar iron was effected merely by heat, and if I would give them leave, they would make a trial some day.... A trial of it has been made this week, and the success has surpassed the most sanguine expectations.... I look upon it as one of the most important discoveries ever made....

A patent for the process, dated 17 June 1766, in the name of the brothers Cranege, was secured. It apparently made little difference to the lives of the brothers. The process was improved soon afterwards, by Peter Onions who received a patent in 1783, and by Henry Cort who received patents in 1783 and 1784 for his improvements.
