= Peter Onions =

Peter Onions (1724 – 1798) was an English ironmaster and the inventor of an early puddling process used for the refining of pig iron into wrought iron.

== Biography ==
Onions was born in Broseley, Shropshire, later moving to Merthyr Tydfil in Wales. He married Elizabeth Guest, sister of John Guest, a founder of Guest, Keen and Nettlefold, which is today the British conglomerate GKN In 1783, Onions received patent number 1370 for his invention. Henry Cort later improved on Onion's process during the development of his puddling furnace.
