= Henry Cort =

English ironmaster (c.1740-1800)

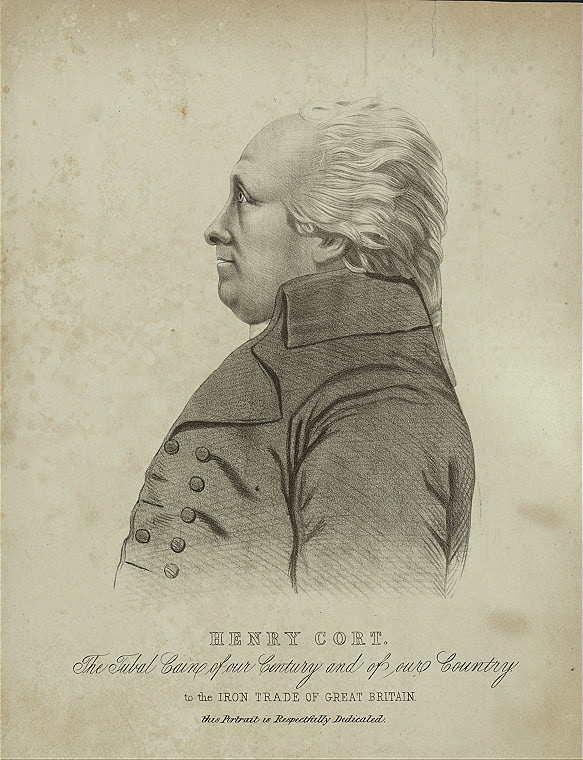
- Henry Cort
- Born: Henry Cort; Circa 1740; Unknown
- Died: Friday 23 May 1800
- Occupations: Inventor, pioneer in the iron industry
- Known for: Inventions relating to puddling and rolling in the manufacture of iron.
- Children: Richard Cort

Henry Cort (c. 1740 – 23 May 1800) was an English ironware producer who was formerly a Navy pay agent. During the Industrial Revolution in England, Cort began refining iron from pig iron to wrought iron (or bar iron) using innovative production systems. In 1784, he obtained a patent for an improved version of Peter Onions's puddling process, for refining cast iron, although its commercial viability was only realised in the 1790s, through further innovations introduced by Richard Crawshay and Homfray of the Cyfarthfa Ironworks in Merthyr Tydfil.

== Biography ==
Little is known of Cort's early life other than that he was possibly born into a family coming originally from Lancaster but living in Jamaica at the time of his (possible) father; another Henry Cort although his parents are not definitely known. Although his date of birth is traditionally given as 1740, this can not be confirmed and his early life remains an enigma. By 1765, Cort had become a Royal Navy pay agent, acting on commission collecting half pay and widows' pensions from an office in Crutched Friars near Aldgate in London. At that time, despite Abraham Darby's improvements in the smelting of iron using coke instead of charcoal as blast furnace fuel, the resultant product was still only convertible to bar iron by a laborious process of decarburization in finery forges. As a result, bar iron imported from the Baltic undercut that produced in Britain.

In 1768, Cort's second marriage was to Elizabeth Heysham, the daughter of a Romsey solicitor and steward of the Duke of Portland whose estates included Titchfield. Her uncle William Attwick, although a successful London attorney, had inherited the family ironmongery business in Gosport which supplied the navy with mooring chains, anchors and hundreds of different items of ironmongery.

=== Partnership with Samuel Jellicoe ===
In 1780, the Royal Navy's Victualling Commissioners reached an agreement with Cort, who had taken over Attwick's business, to convert scrap iron hoops for their barrels. He had recently taken over a rolling mill at an existing iron mill in Titchfield which was later used for the production of bar iron. Short of funds, he turned to Adam Jellicoe, at that time chief clerk in the Pay Office of the Royal Navy, who agreed to loan Cort funds to develop a new method of converting cast iron to bar iron, over the next ten years this amounted to the amount of nearly £58 000 on seemingly little security beyond the value of the business. It was the accepted practice for clerks in the Pay Office to temporarily use surplus funds for their own benefit. As part of the arrangement, Jellicoe's son Samuel became a partner in the Fontley Works. The deal was later to have unfortunate repercussions for Cort.

=== Rolling mill and puddling furnace ===
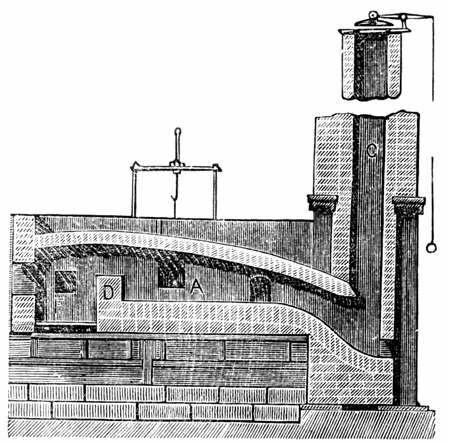
Schematic drawing of a puddling furnace

Cort developed his ideas at the Fontley Works (as he had renamed Titchfield Hammer) resulting in a 1783 patent for a simple reverberatory furnace to refine pig iron followed by a 1784 patent for his puddling furnace, with grooved rollers which mechanised the formerly laborious process. His work built on the existing ideas of the Cranege brothers and their reverberatory furnace (where heat is applied from above, rather than through the use of forced air from below) and (particularly) Peter Onions' puddling process where iron is stirred to separate out impurities and extract the higher quality wrought iron.

The puddling furnace lowered the carbon content of the cast iron charge through oxidation while the "puddler" extracted a mass of iron from the furnace using an iron "rabbling bar". The extracted ball of metal was then processed into a "shingle" by a shingling hammer, after which it was rolled in the rolling mill. The original process of Cort was ineffectual until significant alterations were made by Richard Crawshay and other Merthyr Tydfil ironmasters as Cort used iron from charcoal furnaces rather than the coke smelted pig iron in general production by then.

=== Death of Adam Jellicoe ===
When Adam Jellicoe died suddenly on 30 August 1789, it became apparent that the £58 000 lent to Cort could not be repaid. As a result, the Crown seized all the Property of Adam Jellicoe as well as that of the partnership of Cort and Samuel Jellicoe. Cort was held responsible for Jellicoe's debt and declared bankrupt. The Crown later gave back to Samuel Jellicoe possession of the works at Titchfield and Gosport

=== Patents and royalties ===
The importance of Cort's improvements to the process of bar purported iron making were recognised as early as 1786 by Lord Sheffield who regarded them along with James Watt's work on the steam engine as more important than the loss of America. In 1787, Cort came to an agreement with South Wales ironmaster Richard Crawshay whereby all iron manufactured according to the former's patents would result in a royalty of 10 shillings per ton. However, there were a series of production problems and the death of Adam Jellicoe in 1789 precipitated legal actions by the Crown to recover the money lent by Adam Jellicoe to Cort. As a result of which, Cort was declared bankrupt and although he soon rectified his financial status he never again engaged in industrial activities.

== Personal life ==
Cort's marriage to Elizabeth Heysham produced 13 children. His business ventures did not bring him wealth, even though vast numbers of the puddling furnaces that he developed were eventually used (reportedly 8,200 by 1820), they used a modified version of his process and thus avoided payment of royalties. He was later awarded a government pension, but died a ruined man, and was buried in the churchyard of St John-at-Hampstead, London.
