= Grill family =

Swedish family

Grill
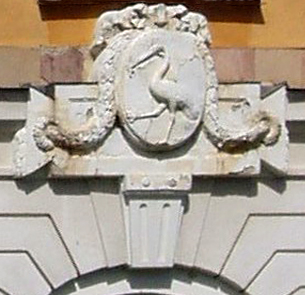
- The Grill family coat of arms at the Österbybruk manor
- Origin: Augsburg, Germany
- Members: Abraham Grill (I) the Elder; Johan Abraham Grill; Claes Grill (I); Jean Abraham Grill; Claes Grill (II); Adolf Ulric Grill
- Distinctions: Prominent in trade, mining, manufacturing, banking and politics
- Estates: Numerous during the 18th and 19th centuries
- Motto: Honesty is the best policy.

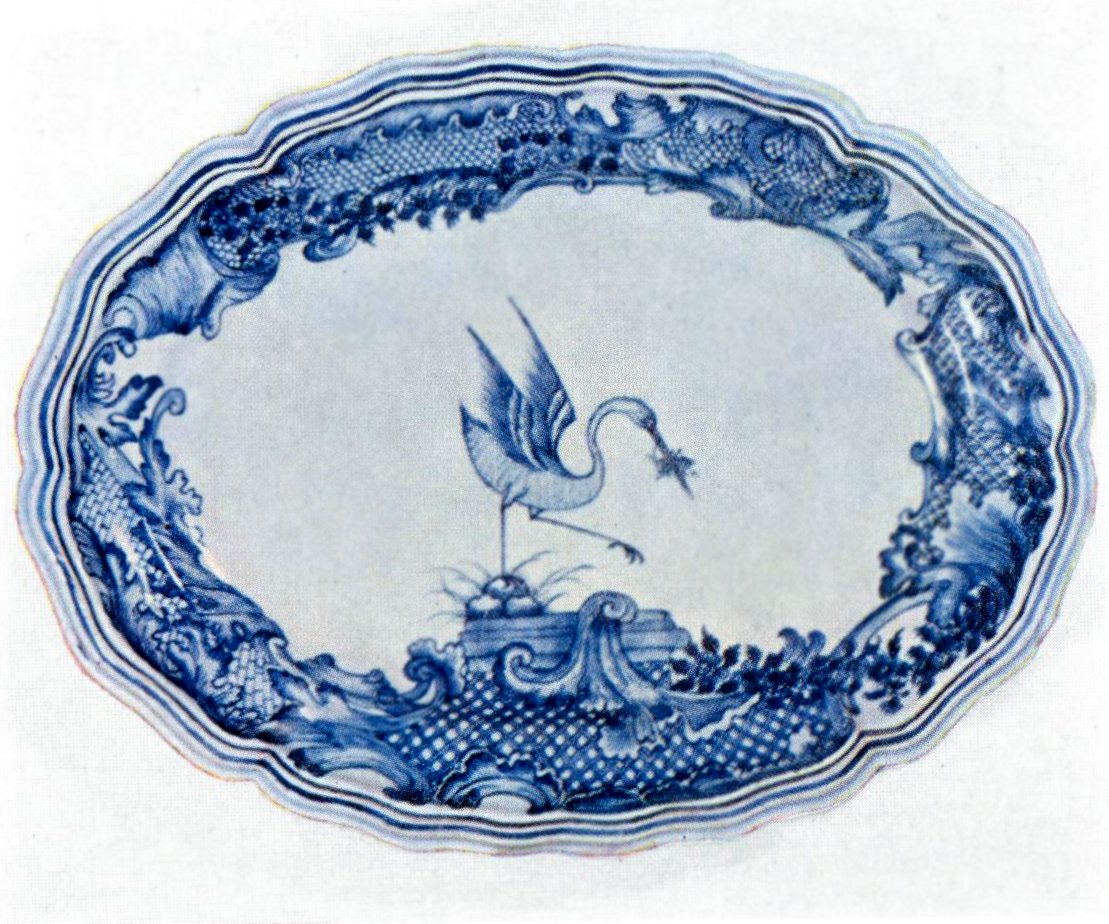
"Chine de commande" dish, a private commission, with the Grill coat of arms.

The Grill family are noted for their contribution to the Swedish iron industry and for exports of iron and copper during the 18th century. Starting as silversmiths and experts on noble metals the Grills became engaged in a wide range of businesses. After 1700 the family began its rise to prominence. They owned ironworks, while operating wharves, and importing material related to shipbuilding. The Grills benefited from mercantilist policy. With a positive balance on their account the Grills became engaged in banking, also in the Dutch Republic; around 1720 in the market for government liabilities and then mediating large credits and clearing international bills of exchange. The Grills had significant influence with the Swedish East India Company (SOIC); three members became directors of the SOIC and the Grill firm traded as members of the SOIC and privately.

All the noted Grills were in some way connected to the main Grill Trading House and to each other. Some Grills married a relative, others helped their nephews into business. In this way the Grill name was kept and passed on through the generations.

== Origin ==
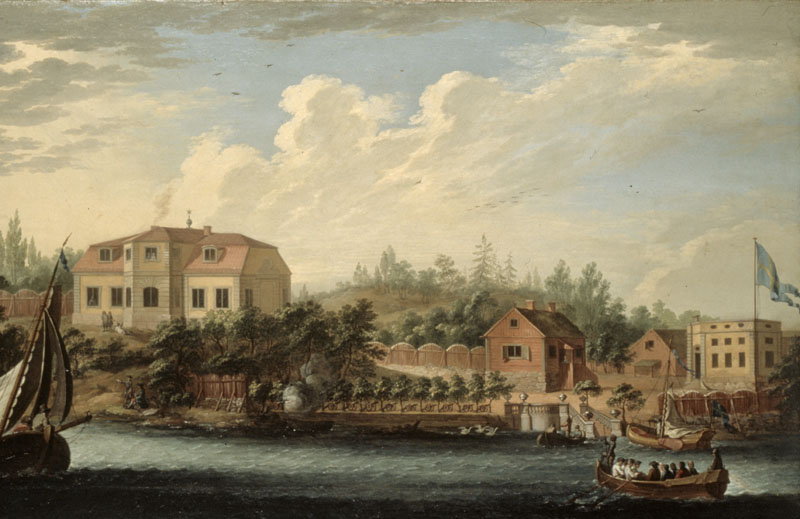
Svindersvik, a country house owned by the Grills with the SOIC flag. (Note: The swallow-tailed version of the Swedish flag was used on the ships of the SOIC even though the use of such a flag was prohibited. Only ships in the Swedish Navy were entitled to fly a (triple-)tailed flag. The SOIC ships used the two-tailed version, that looked like a navy flag, to discourage pirates at sea. Despite the prohibition, Claes Grill (I) ordered several flags in Canton. He even used them at his summer residence, Svindersvik, on land and on the rowboat taking him to and from the house. One of these flags remained at Svindersvik and is one of the oldest, preserved flags in Sweden. As of 2014 it is kept at the Livrustkammaren.)

On 29 June 1571, Andreas Grill, burgher in Augsburg received burgher arms in letters patent from a count palatine of the Holy Roman Empire. The name Grill comes from the Italian Grillo, meaning cricket, while the family's coat of arms displays a crane holding a cricket in its bill. (Note: A grey crane on a golden field, looking left, standing with one foot on three black stones surrounded by foliage.)

The family came to Sweden with the arrival of the silversmith Anthoni Grill (I) in 1659. For more than 25 years Anthoni had lived in Amsterdam, but moved to Stockholm when he was appointed as the Riksguardie (the national appraiser) responsible for the quality of alloys and the accuracy of weights and measures, and the stock of precious metals used in minting. He was succeeded at the Myntverket by his son Anthoni Grill (II).

During the 18th century the family was described as members of the Skeppsbroadeln (the Skeppsbro Nobility). Abraham Grill had six sons who cooperated in business. The name referred to the wealthiest merchant families in Stockholm at that time, especially those who lived by the quays along the Skeppsbron.

The family consisted of two branches —the Garphyttan branch, starting with Anthoni (IV) and the Godegård branch, with Jean Abraham Grill. Since 1911 the Grill family is included in the Ointroducerad Adels Förening (Association of the Unintroduced Nobility), an association for Swedish citizens whose family was ennobled in a foreign country, as well as some families who were ennobled in Sweden but for some reason never introduced at the Swedish House of Nobility.

== Anthoni Grill (I) ==
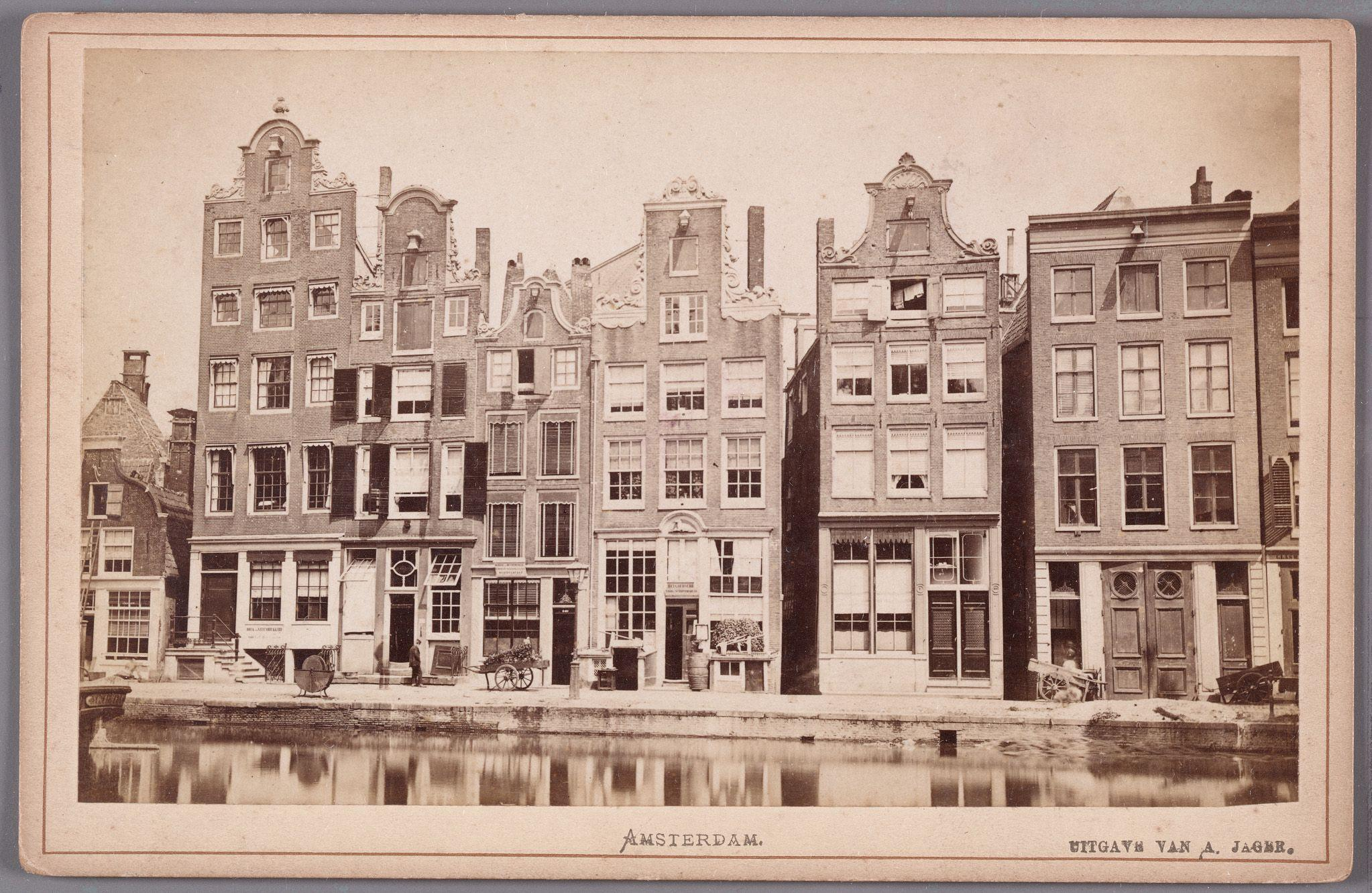
Nieuwezijds Voorburgwal where Anthoni Grill (I) began his career. The alley on the left led to the jeweller shop in Kalverstraat.

Anthonie Grill (1607–1675) was born in Augsburg as the son of goldsmith Balthasar Grill (1568–1614) and Rosina Schweigler. The city was a centre of European silversmithery. During the Thirty Years' War, the Lutheran city was occupied by a Bavarian army but recaptured by the Swedish army in April 1632. At some point, Anthoni and his brother Andries moved to Amsterdam. The two silversmiths both got married in January 1634, and Andries for the second time in February 1640, who had then settled in The Hague. Their younger brother Johannes (I), a journeyman, got married in September 1645. (Note: His portrait is preserved in a miniature silver relief kept in the collections of the Amsterdam Museum.)

In December 1635, Anthoni promised his business partner (Note: Elias van Wolffswinckel) to reveal a secret about smelting silver, which is generally found in a combined state in nature, usually with copper or lead. In 1637 and 1642 he took on and lodged two apprentices. In 1638 he became a burgher of Amsterdam. In March 1651 Anthoni bought a property for 12,000 guilders between Looiersgracht and Passeerdersstraat. There Anthoni set up a number of laboratories or furnaces, testing fresh and recycled metals to ascertain their purity for jewellery and coin making. In 1653, Anthoni, somehow connected to or observed by members of the Hartlib Circle, cooperated in an alchemist project with his brother Andries. According to Johann Friedrich Schweitzer they used a hydrochloric acid.

It is possible that a son of Michiel le Blon, a goldsmith, art dealer and agent for Christina, Queen of Sweden, informed the Swedish Board of Mines about Grill's experiments to extract precious metals from ore through the use of what Grill called a "secret matter". On 28 May 1658, this earned him the position of riksguardie, working for the Münzmeister at the Swedish Mint. He also got a 30-years patent on his "secret" extraction methods. Anthoni moved to Stockholm after 10 June 1659. His silver smelting lab was rented out by Cornelis le Blon to the chemical engineer Johann Rudolf Glauber, until it was sold for 20,880 guilders on a foreclosure auction in January 1661.

Grill continued his smelting experiments with cupellation of noble metals in Sweden. With three companions he was allowed to conduct experiments with copper and lead from the Lövåsens silvermine in Stora Skedvi. However, his methods were never successful and his work at the mint was substandard. His deficiencies at the mint were brought to light by Georg Stiernhielm in 1662, and the next year, his smelting methods were strongly criticized by the Board of Mines where its chairman, Erik Fleming, (Note: 1616–1679) accused Grill of defaming him. In 1663, Grill was demoted to handling the weighing of precious metals and other "minor items and tasks", while Jöran Low became the new riksguardie. in 1661 he introduced credit paper (Kreditivsedlar), the first European banknotes with copper as collateral. The lack of silver, the cumbersome size and weight of copper plate money eventually prompted Sweden to become the first country in Europe to issue such notes. In 1624 Sweden had introduced a copper standard; in 1664 Sweden reintroduced the silver standard.

== Anthoni Grill (II) ==
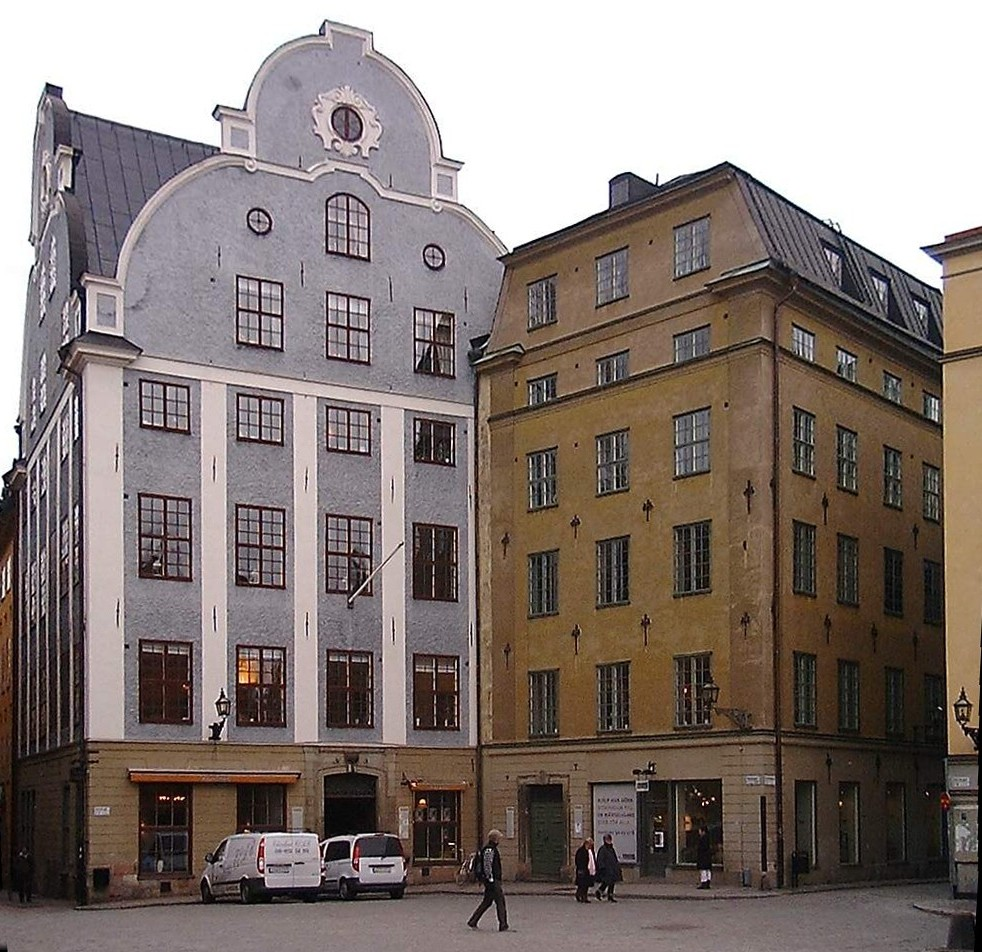
Grill townhouse (left), bought by Anthoni (II) in 1681.

Anthoni Grill (1639–1703) was the son of Anthoni Grill (I) and Catharina Staets. (Note: The other surviving children were Rosina (1635), Lysbeth (1636–1693), Johanna (1642), Catharina (1644), Balthasar (1646–1697) and Johannes II (1649–1673)) In 1664 he married Anna van Slingeland in Stockholm. Following in his father's footsteps, he was appointed riksguardie in 1667, checking the quality of the silver. Grill had numerous reform proposals for the mining industry at Sala Silver Mine, and Stora Kopparberget, which produced two thirds of the world's copper. His brother Baltasar, also worked at the Swedish Mint but as a skedare (Note: Probably derived from the German word Goldscheider, schied being an old word for "separate". Swedish has many loanwords from German and sometimes they are just made to sound Swedish even if the meaning becomes distorted.) (lit. "spooner" meaning gold parter), (Note: A skedare worked with professional purification/extraction of precious metals.) and took part in Kungsholmen's glassworks in 1682. In 1694 Anthoni became one of the shareholders of the Big City shipyard in Stockholm. He participated in the gilding of the newly built northern wing of the Royal Palace.

After being widowed, Anna van Slingeland (−1714) moved from Gamla stan to Amsterdam, where several of her children lived. (Note: Anthoni (III), Catharina (1666–1739), Johannes (III) (1668–1734), Maria (1673–1732), Isaak (1676–1698), Dorothea (−1717) and Sophia (1682–1766).) In 1716 Sophia Grill remarried – on a prenuptial agreement – Nikolaas Kohl, a tradesman on the Baltic, originating from Arensborg. On 10 August 1734, Kohl bought The Conspiracy of Claudius Civilis, for 60 guilders. Originally 500 cm × 550 cm (200 in × 220 in), it was the largest work Rembrandt painted. (Note: Around 1782 the painting was recanvassed by Erik Hallblad, who added an extra sword. It was then shown in the Swedish Academy of Fine Arts. In 1785 it was transported to Stockholm Palace. Since 1864, the painting is kept in the Nationalmuseum, Stockholm.) The couple had a small estate near Zwammerdam, where Sophia died in August 1766. (Note: In 1746 their son Nicolaas Anthoni was appointed as prosecutor in Surinam. In January 1648 he married the daughter of governor Jan Jacob Mauricius. It probably explains why several members of the Grill family were involved in the plantation "La Jalousie" during the second half of the 18th century.) (Note: In 1784 Sofia's daughter Maria Dorothea Kohl declared in her will that her niece in Stockholm, Anna Maria Gemnich, whose grandmother was Anna Maria Grill, would be her only heir.)

== Anthoni Grill (III) ==
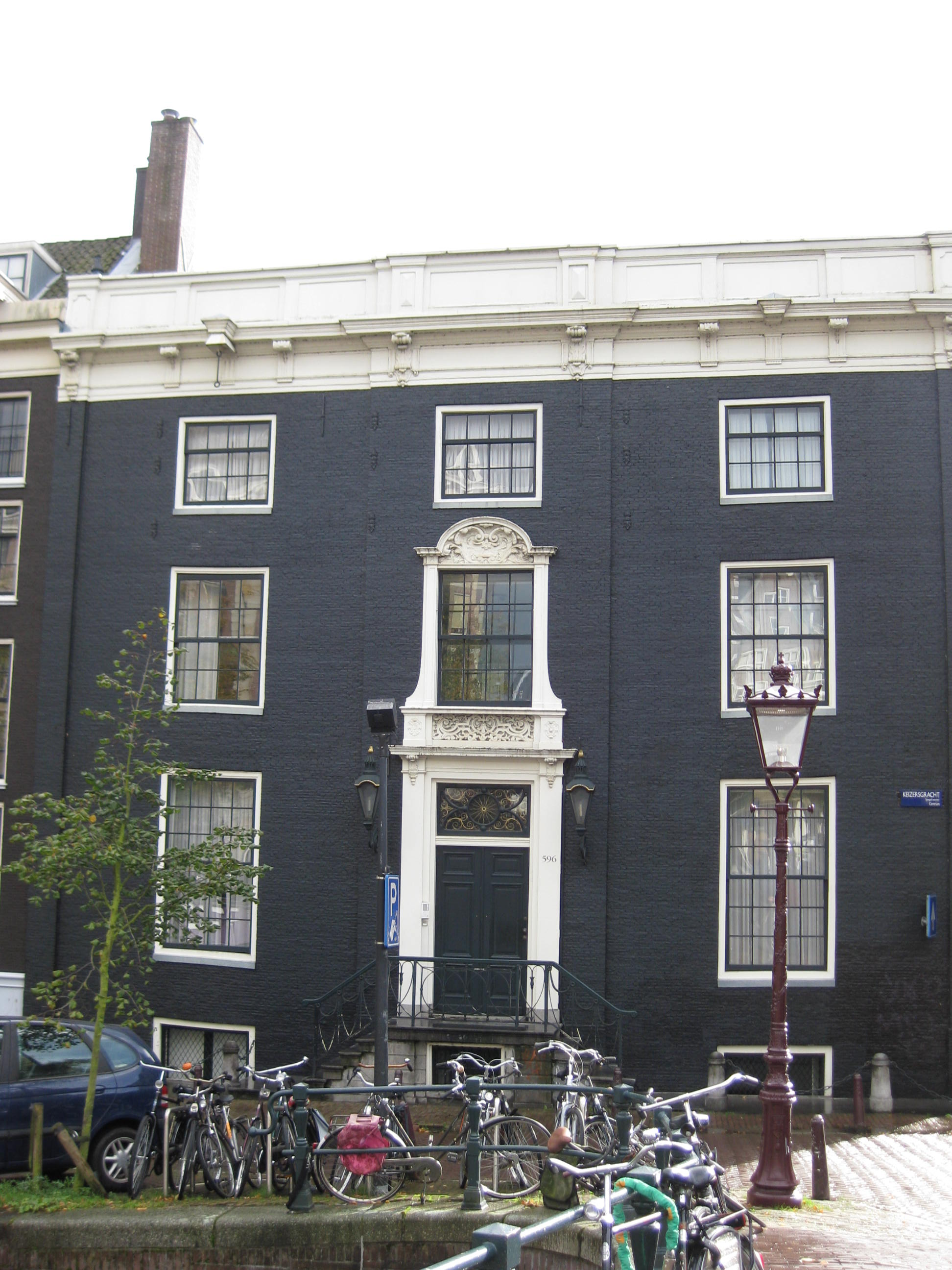
Keizersgracht 596, owned by Anthoni (III) from 1713

Anthoni Grill (1664–1727) returned to Amsterdam in 1686 and married his cousin Elisabeth Grill in 1693. He settled as silversmith in Kalverstraat, where the Grills owned a shop almost next to a hidden church. (Note: His predecessors were his uncle Johannes (1614–1670), appointed in 1663 as assayer at the Wisselbank, who was also the father of his wife, her brothers Johannes (1647–1673) and Elias (1655–1681), her brother-in-law Andries Gallus (1656–1706) and in 1700 her nephew Pieter Bartels.) In December 1693 he was admitted as a private assayer. Between 1702 and 1742 the Grills imported copper plates (c.q. plate money) from Sweden. As Europe's copper supplier, Sweden exported copper and more so when the copper price was high, exporting their copper plate money as bullion. In January 1711 Anthoni and Johannes Grill (III) were appointed as assayers at the Wisselbank. From 1713 onwards, the bank reported (Note: In a collective item on the profit and loss accounts) on their profits. (Note: At first assayers were allowed to keep 5% then 10% of the profit as provision.) Until 1725, on average, nearly half of the bank profit was attributable to the activities of ten assayers. The Grills had no children and they started a courtyard with almshouses known as Grill's hofje. They were both buried in the Oude Lutherse Kerk at Singel in Amsterdam. In 1728, his collection of fine paintings and rare objects was sold. (Note: He was in contact with another collector Nicolaes Witsen. In 1726, Johannes (III) Grill bought for 2.7 million guilders and sold for around 1.7 million guilders, a total cash turnover of 4.4 million guilders.)

== Abraham Grill (I) the Elder ==
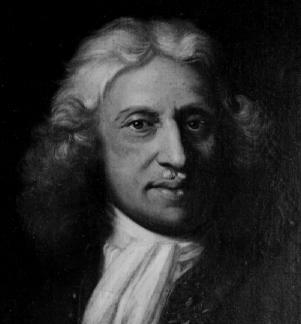
Abraham Grill (I) the Elder.

Abraham Grill (1674 – 20 March 1725) was a Swedish merchant. He was the son of Anthoni (II), a brother of Anthoni (III) as well as heir to the Grill family fortune in Sweden, which he increased through trade speculation. He married three times, and had seven children

From 1704 Abraham Grill cooperated with his brother-in-law Abraham Gemnich (1665–1711). In 1709 Sweden reintroduced the copper standard which was in use till 1766. In 1715 the company bought reclaimed land, from Countess Elisabeth Oxenstierna, in the east part of Stockholm. The land was used to establish the Terra Nova wharf, (Note: Terra Nova is Latin for "new land" and refers to the reclaimed land it was built upon.) also known as the Köpmannavarvet (the Merchants Wharf). In 1716, he and his younger brother Carlos Grill, founded the Grill Trading House. The house traded mainly (90%) in wrought iron and became one of the leading trading houses in Stockholm during the 18th century. In 1722 he acquired the ironworks at Iggesund.

During the Great Northern War led by King Charles XII, Abraham gave large sums of money to the state and during a time of famine, he sold grain at reduced price to the needy. He was also the driving force behind the founding of a house for poor elderly widows in Stockholm on 14 July 1724. When Abraham died in 1725, his share of the Trading House went to his son Claes (I). He owned the house by Stortorget, 1/11 share in the glassworks and 1/3 in the shipyard.

== Anthoni Grill (IV) ==
Anthoni Grill (19 April 1705 – 22 March 1783) was the son of Abraham (I) Grill and Helena Wittmack and twin brother to Claes (I). Around 1722, he moved to Amsterdam where he participated in his uncles' trading house, dealing in copper plates and iron and supplying the Dutch East India Company between 1722 and 1731 with silver.

The Dutch had very little to offer in Asia but silver and gold. Therefore the VOC ships had to sail to Asia with silver bars and gold coins to pay for Asian goods. The bars were cast in private factories, run by assayers, from melted down coins, mainly from Spanish American "reales". Once in Asia these bars were melted down and minted again into coins such as rupees, that could be used in the East.

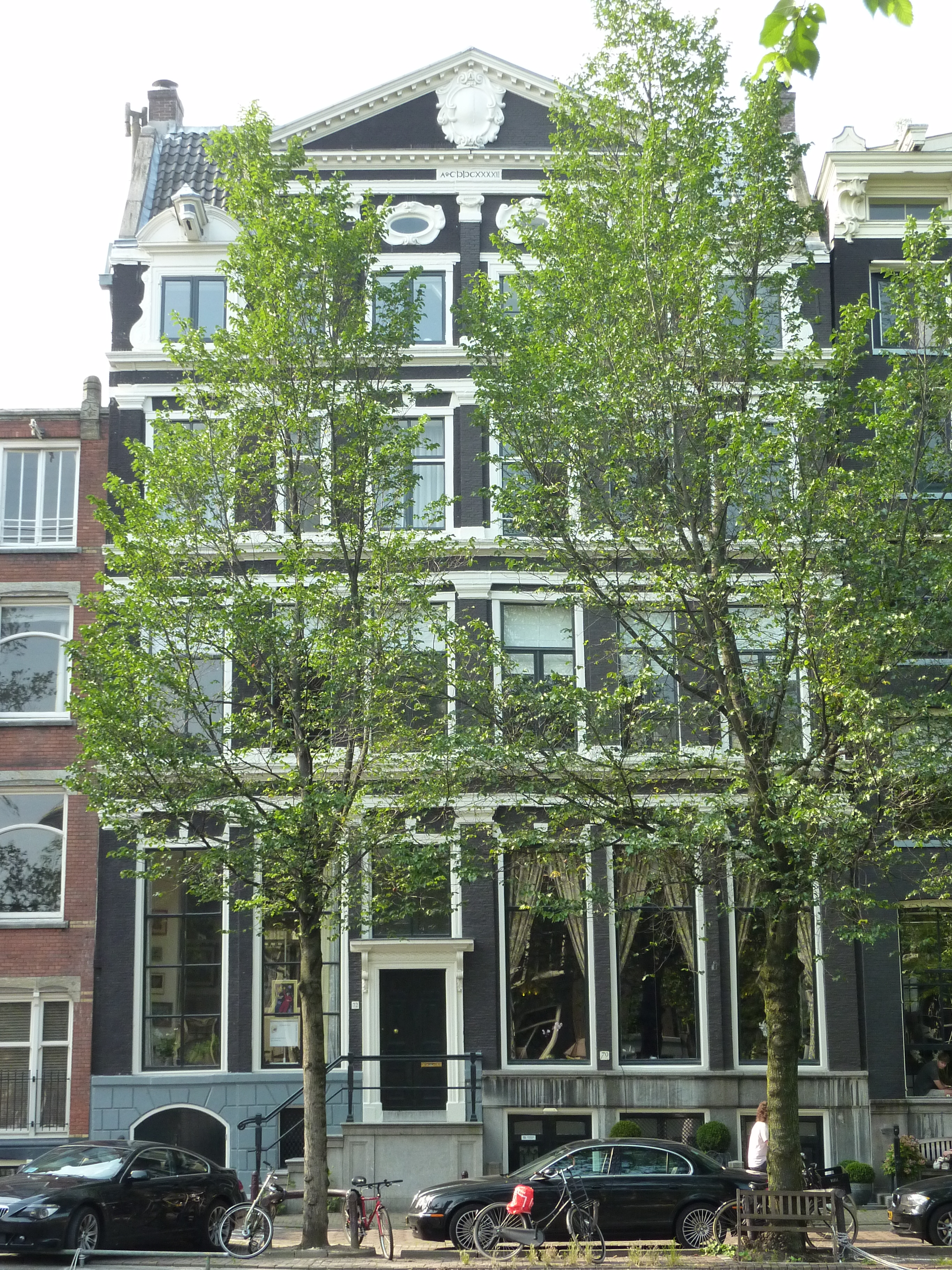
Herengracht 72, where Anthoni lived in 1742.

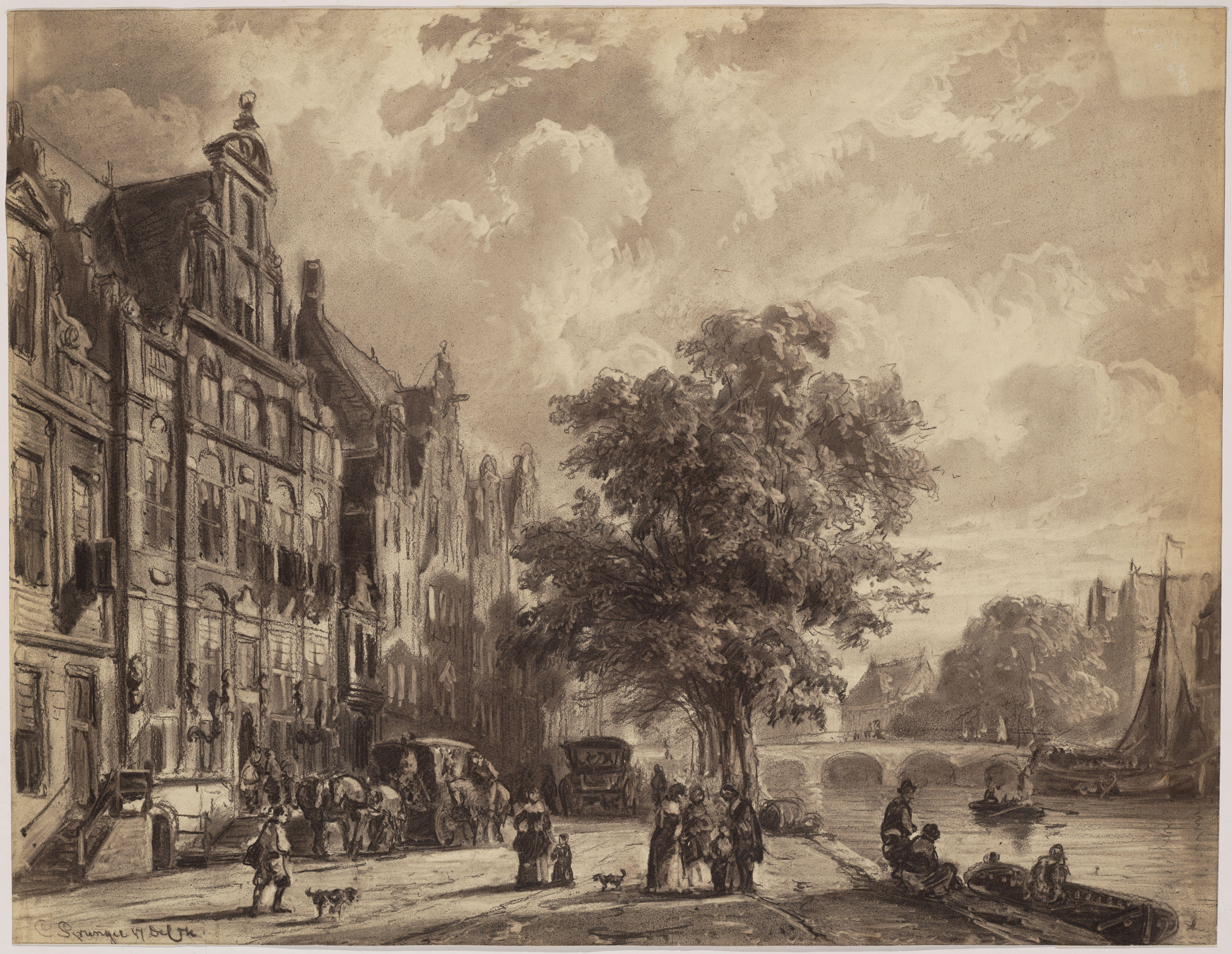
Keizersgracht en het Huis met de Hoofden, where the brothers Grill lived in 1752 by Cornelis Springer

In 1733 he married Alida Jacoba Hilken with whom he had eight children. In 1735 he cooperated with his brother Johannes (IV) to promote the trade with Sweden. Spanish pieces of eight were used to produce silver ingots that were shipped on the Rooswijk, which sank in 1740. In 1742 both brothers lived separately on Herengracht; they each owned a chaise and two horses. In 1747 they sold the silver melting business at the end of Spiegelgracht, and concentrated on banking and assurance on ships and goods for customers in Sweden. Around 1751, they moved into the "Huis met de Hoofden" which they rented from the descendants of Louis De Geer. He wrote twice a week to Stockholm. When Johannes died – with whom he shared many bills of exchange – Anthoni Grill became the only heir and his other siblings were bequeathed.

The trading house in Amsterdam wrote a bill for the amount for which it bought goods from a Swedish seller. The seller could then obtain money by selling the bill to someone who wanted to buy goods, in Amsterdam or elsewhere, and use the bill to pay for them. Importers and exporters both bought bills, to pay and to obtain money. Bills that were not cashed immediately earned interest. A bill that was transferred before it matured was sold at a discount. The interest due from the transfer date up to maturity was deducted from the bill's nominal value. The higher the rate of interest, the larger the discount.

During the Seven Years' War France gave a total of 11 million sd. in subsidies to Sweden. In 1759, Anthoni lodged Bengt Ferner, a Swedish astronomer and mathematician, who kept a diary about his travels in Holland. Accompanied by Jacob Grill, Ferner visited the mint in Utrecht and Harderwijk, run by inlaws. In 1762 the name of the bank changed to Antoni Grill & Soonen. In 1768, as in 1736, the Swedish mystic, inventor and mining specialist Emanuel Swedenborg visited Grill. During the Amsterdam banking crisis of 1763, he was considerably involved in the bankruptcy of Leendert Pieter de Neufville, who failed to come to an agreement with his bankers. In December 1768 there was a crisis in Sweden. In 1769 the Caps were in favour of deregulation and encouraging free trade, however, they went swiftly to the other economic extreme. They immediately cut off state loans to industries and forced the Riksbank collect all their credits. This led to economic downturn as industrialists were forced to sell off their machinery to pay off debts, and workers suddenly lost their jobs. Their financial situation of the clearinghouse deteriorated, because of fluctuating exchange rates in the recent past. In 1773, Anthoni became owner of the Garphyttan factories when the previous owner (Michael Grubb) failed to repay the money he had borrowed from him. To be able to manage the factories, his sons Jacob (1734–1799), Abraham (1735–1805) and Anthony Grill Jr (1743–1805) moved to Stockholm. Their sister Helena Catharina (1739–1804) owned a quarter in the profitable "La Jalousie" plantation along the Commewijne River and stayed in business. Both her father and Helena were buried in Amsterdam.

== Claes Grill (I) ==
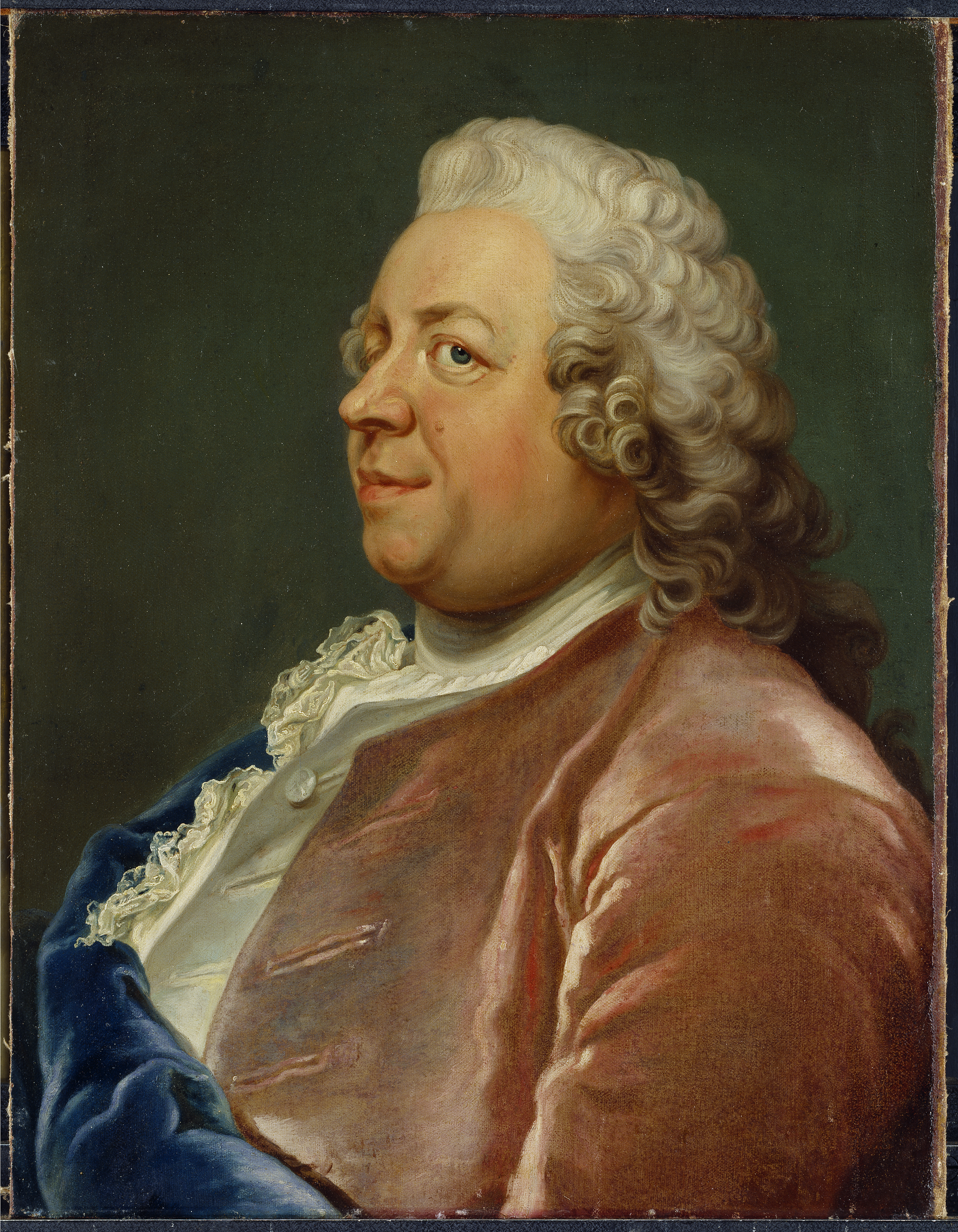
Claes Grill (I) by Gustaf Lundberg

Claes Grill (19 April 1705 – 6 November 1767) was the son of Abraham (I) Grill and Helena Wittmack and twin brother to Anthoni (IV), with whom he cooperated. Claes married his uncle Carlos' daughter, Anna Johanna (I) Grill (1720–1778). They had two children, Adolf Ulric, collector and natural scientist, and a daughter named Anna Johanna (II). (Note: The foundation of the Österby collection was formed in the late 18th century by the merchant and ironmaster Henrik Wilhelm Peill (1730–1797) and his wife Anna Johanna Grill (1745–1801), who resided in the manor of Österbybruk in Uppland. As the protégé of Count Carl Gustaf Tessin, Henrik Wilhelm Peill came to Paris in the 1760s during his educational tour in Europe where he met the well-known portrait painter Alexander Roslin and his wife Marie Suzanne Giroust. Peill, who on his mother's side was related to the family of artist Martin Mijtens the Elder, became a close friend to Roslin. When he returned home he married Anna Johanna Grill.) In 1739 he became a member of the Swedish Academy of Sciences.

Claes was a merchant, factory owner and ship-owner. He was director of the Grill Trading House, one of the leading companies in the East India trade through the Swedish East India Company (SOIC). On his wharf a number of the ships for the SOIC were built. The trading house also ran a banking business and insured shares in ships and goods. At the death of Carlos in 1736, Claes (I) was sole owner of the company until his half-brother Johan Abraham joined him as a partner in 1747. In 1748 he bought the anchor-works at Söderfors. He owned already the ironworks in Iggesund; the Dutch Republic was the main destination of bar iron, but after 1750 it was France. He imported salt from Portugal and the Mediterranean, silver, tobacco and paintings from the Netherlands, and shipbuilding material (pitch, tar, cloth, hemp and planks) from the Baltic countries. He had three agents in Rouen, but Marseille became a staple market to distribute the Swedish products in all Mediterranean regions. Grill also owned several estates in Uppland and a house at Norrmalmstorg.

Claes had an unsuccessful political career. In December 1747 he was appointed in the Växelkontoret (Exchange Office), a financial institution created to stabilize exchange rates of the Swedish currency. In the same month Grill was appointed in the Association of Ironmasters. The same men ruled both institutions and that created opportunities for private initiative and abuse of power. In 1749 he promoted a Swedish merchant fleet. In 1753 he was appointed to the SOIC. During the winter and spring months of 1757–1758, the Stockholm bills of exchange market ran out of control. The Exchange office survived until the beginning of 1761. The associates obtained a compensation over 2 million for their expenses. In March 1765 the Caps launched a legal investigation of Claes and Johan Abraham Grill, etc. In 1766 Claes was fined, together with his half-brother. They were accused of conscious mismanagement of the office for their own profit. The Grills sentenced to pay back half a million to the Riksen Ständers Bank. Claes Grill lost his civil and burgher rights. His widow continued to run the Trading House; her son Adolf Ulrich took over the business in 1778.

== Abraham Grill (II) the Younger ==
Abraham Grill (28 January 1707 – 28 January 1768) was the son of Abraham (I) and brother of Anthoni (IV), Claes (I), and half-brother to Johan Abraham. He started his career as Swedish consul in Helsingør in 1733 to 1736. During his time in Denmark he met Anna Maria Petersen, and they were married in 1735. They had thirteen children of which five died at an early age.

Abraham and his family moved to Gothenburg in 1746, where he established a trading house. That year, he was also one of the directors for the SOIC during the second charter. He cooperated closely with the two other trading houses in the Grill family at that time: Carlos & Claes Grill in Stockholm and Anthony & Johannes Grill in Amsterdam. Abraham's trading house handled most of the copper exported from Gothenburg during a few years in the 1760s. The company also exported iron and tea, brought to Gothenburg by the SOIC.

One of Abraham's many children, Lorentz Grill, became his partner in the trading house in 1761. At the death of Abraham (on his birthday) in 1768, Lorentz sought out new partners and continued running the company.

== Johan Abraham Grill ==
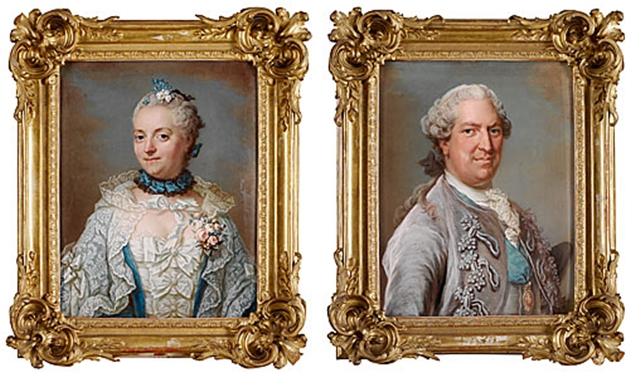
Christina Elisabeth Grill and Johan Abraham Grill by Gustaf Lundberg

Johan Abraham Grill (1719 – 16 March 1799) was a Swedish merchant and politician. He was the son of Abraham (I), the Elder, and Katarina Rozelius, his third wife. He was a half-brother to Claes (I), Abraham (II) and uncle to Jean Abraham. He married Christina Elisabeth Fischer (1731–1805). It was Johan Abraham who introduced a motto for the Grill family: Ärlighet warar längst (Honesty is the best policy.).

In 1747, Johan Abraham became partner in the Grill Trading House. Throughout his career he held a number of official positions and received several awards. In 1763, he became a board member in the Jernkontoret (Association of Ironmasters), established in 1747, it is the oldest trade association in Sweden. In 1767, he was a member of the Sjöförsäkringsrätten (The Naval Insurance Court) where he handled disputes related to shipping that could not be settled in any other way. With the third charter, he became director of the SOIC in 1770. At the same time he was an accountant and also responsible for credits and loans issued from the Swedish State to various companies.

Johan Abraham was a member of the hat party and helped finance the Swedish court and the hats activity in the Riksdag 1771–72, especially in connection to King Gustav III's coup d'état on 19 August 1772, whereby the king's power was solidified. The money for the coup had to be smuggled out from the Grill House in Stockholm, to the Royal castle in double-bottomed wooden troughs filled with mortar. Johan Abraham continued to run the Trading House after Claes (I)'s death in 1767. In 1799, Johan Abraham died and the company went bankrupt.

== Jacob Grill ==
Jacob Grill (1734–1799) was a Swedish ironworks owner. He was born in Amsterdam, the son of Anthoni Grill (IV). He never married and had no children.

In 1759 he accompanied Bengt Ferner on his travel through the Netherlands. In 1769, Jacob became the owner of the Skebo and Ortala ironworks, the Norrtälje gun factory and the Männäis blast furnace in Nykyrka, Åbo, when the previous owner was forced to sell due to financial difficulties. During his time at Skebo, Jacob built the Skebo Manor in 1767 to 1770. Jacob moved to Sweden with his brothers when his father became the owner of the Garphyttan ironworks. He was very inexperienced in how to operate the ironworks, and they gradually became the property of his lender, the Tottie & Arfwedson Trading House, and in 1782, the transfer was complete. Jacob moved to Broby, then Graneberg and finally to Nyköping where he died penniless.

== Jean Abraham Grill ==
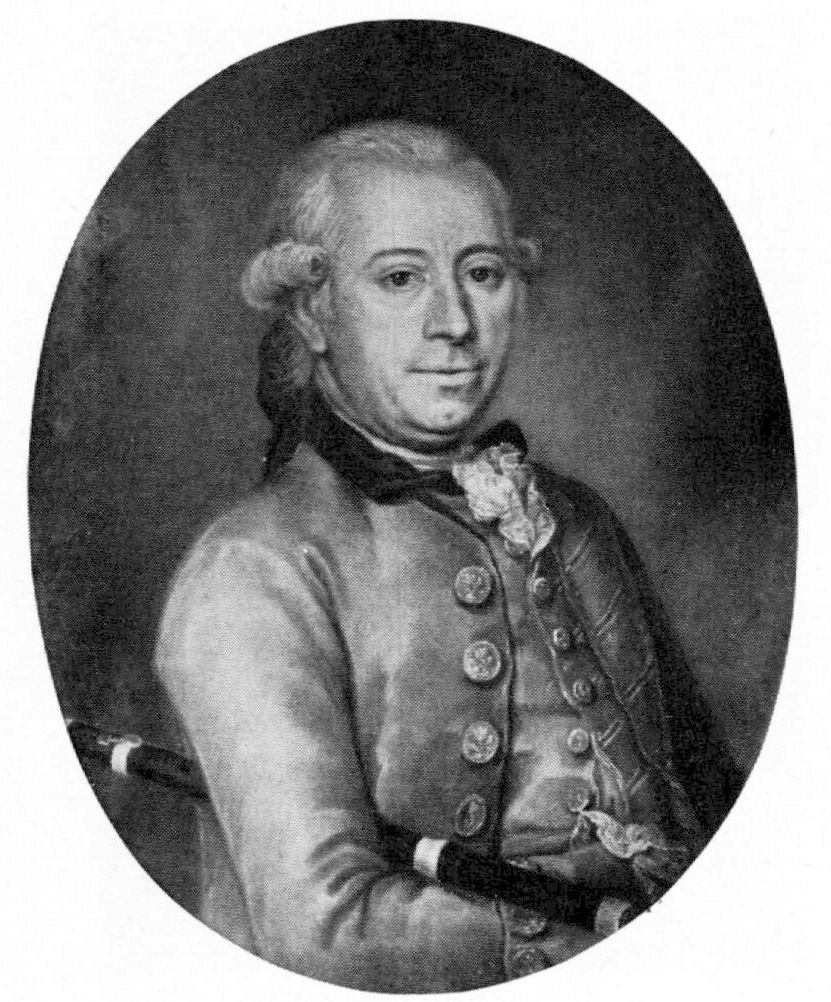
Jean (Johan) Abraham Grill

Jean Abraham Grill (21 July 1736 – 12 March 1792), sometimes called Johan Abraham Grill, was a Swedish merchant, supercargo and director of the SOIC as well as an ironmaster. Jean Abraham was the oldest son of merchant Abraham (II), and Anna Maria Petersen.

In 1753 he joined the trading house. He journeyed to China twice in 1755 and 1761. (In between he lived in France.) He lived in Canton as well as Macao for eight years. He was the representative in Canton for the SOIC, because of the Canton System. Since 1732 Swedish merchants traded in Canton now known as Guangzhou. He also had two trading companies, one together with Michael Grubb, trading with the countries close to China, and one of his own, which he used for trading tea and smuggling opium from India to China.

When he returned to Sweden, he bought from the De Geer family the Godegård ironworks and manor, along with several other ironworks, that he renovated and improved. All his notes, correspondence, accounts, cargo lists and books are preserved in the Godegård Archive.

== Claes Grill (II) ==
Claes Grill (2 September 1750 – 2 August 1816) was a Swedish merchant. He was the son of Abraham Grill (II). In 1770, he settled down in London, where he met and married Maria Hackson. They had three children.

In 1770, Claes became partner in the Anglo-Swedish company Andrew & Charles Lindegren, a London-based importer of Swedish iron. Andrew & Charles Lindegren traded with the Carlos & Claes Grill (the Grill Trading House) and was the major supplier of iron to the British East India Company. The name of the company was changed first to Lindegren & Grill, and later to Lindegren son & Grill. By that name, the company continued to serve as an agent for the East India Company in Portsmouth.

Claes became Counsel General to London in 1786 to 1815, Both he and William Chalmers applied for that position, but Claes was better known in the London society, had lived longer in England and was connected to a large trading house. By the time he died in Chelsea in 1816, Claes was also partners with a merchant, Harrison, in London.

== Adolf Ulric Grill ==
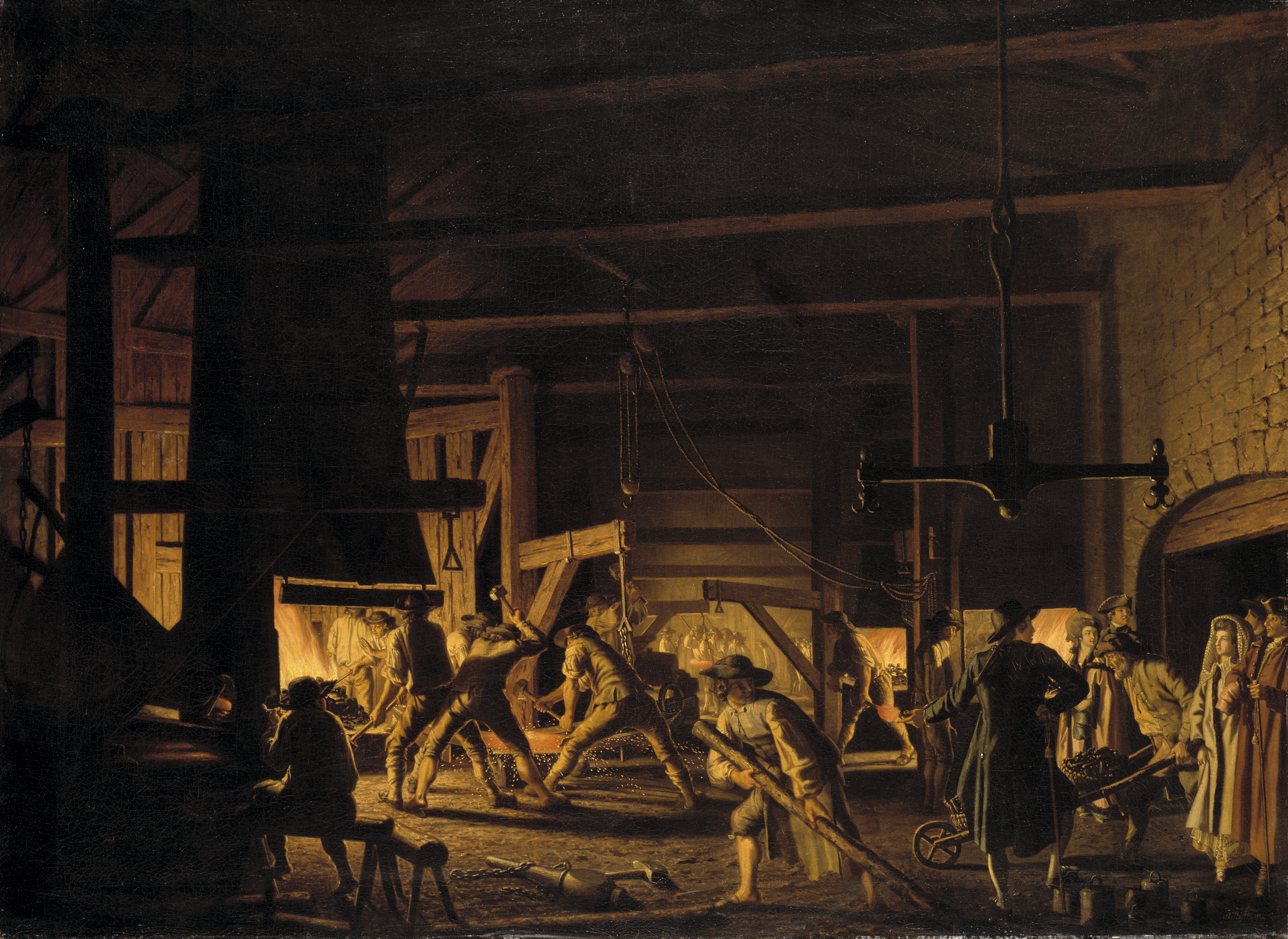
In the Anchor-Forge at Söderfors by Pehr Hilleström, depicting Adolf Ulric on the right.

Adolf (Adolph) Ulric Grill (19 March 1752 – 1 October 1797) was a Swedish ironworks owner and scientific collector of animals and fossils for his cabinet of curiosities at Söderfors. He married his cousin, Anna Johanna (III) (1753–1809) in Stockholm on 7 June 1778, they had one son who died at an early age. At the time of his marriage, Adolf Ulric lived in the Grill house in Stockholm. He and his wife moved to Söderfors when he inherited the ironworks and manor from his father Claes (I) in 1767. In Söderfors, he established a zoological museum which, at the time, was the largest collection in the Nordic countries.

== Estates, mansions and factories ==
These are some of the estates and factories owned by members of the Grill family or by the Grill Trading House during the 18th and 19th century.

=== The Grill house, Stockholm ===
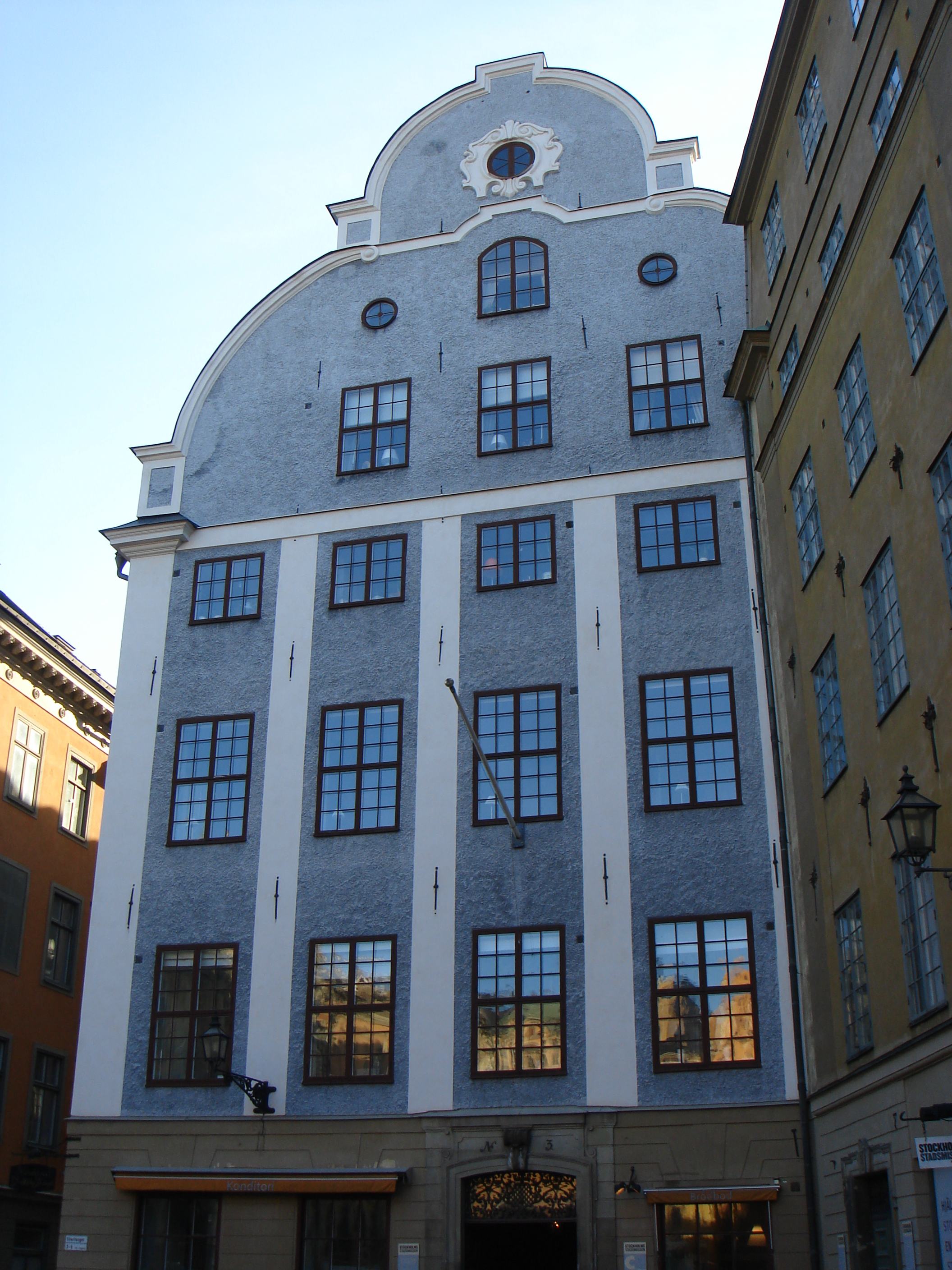
The Grill house in Gamla stan, Stockholm

The Grill House at Stortorget 3 in Gamla stan, Stockholm was built during the Middle Ages and thoroughly converted in 1649. Although subsequently remodelled in 1750 and 1914, the large moulded baroque gable and some of the painted joists date to the 17th-century conversion. The classic lesene of the facade and some of the interior are from the mid 18th century. It acquired its name in the 17th century when the house was purchased by Anthoni Grill (II). The Grill family owned the house for more than two hundred years and as of 2013, it houses the Stockholms Stadsmission (The Stockholm City Mission).

=== The Grill mansion, Uppsala ===
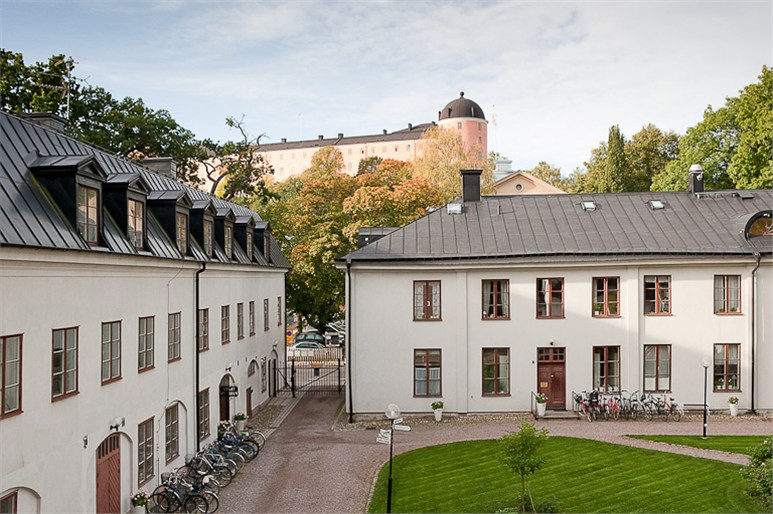
Grill manor, Uppsala

The Grill family (possibly Claes Grill (I)) started to build the Grill manor in central Uppsala after the great fire in 1766. At the time, the family owned ironworks at Söderfors and Österby in Uppland, as well as at Iggesund in Hälsingland. The estate was completed in 1770. The Grill family owned the manor until 1790. It is the only preserved town manor in Uppsala. As of 2013, it houses apartments and offices for the Red cross and Save the Children.

=== The Lennart Torstensons palace ===
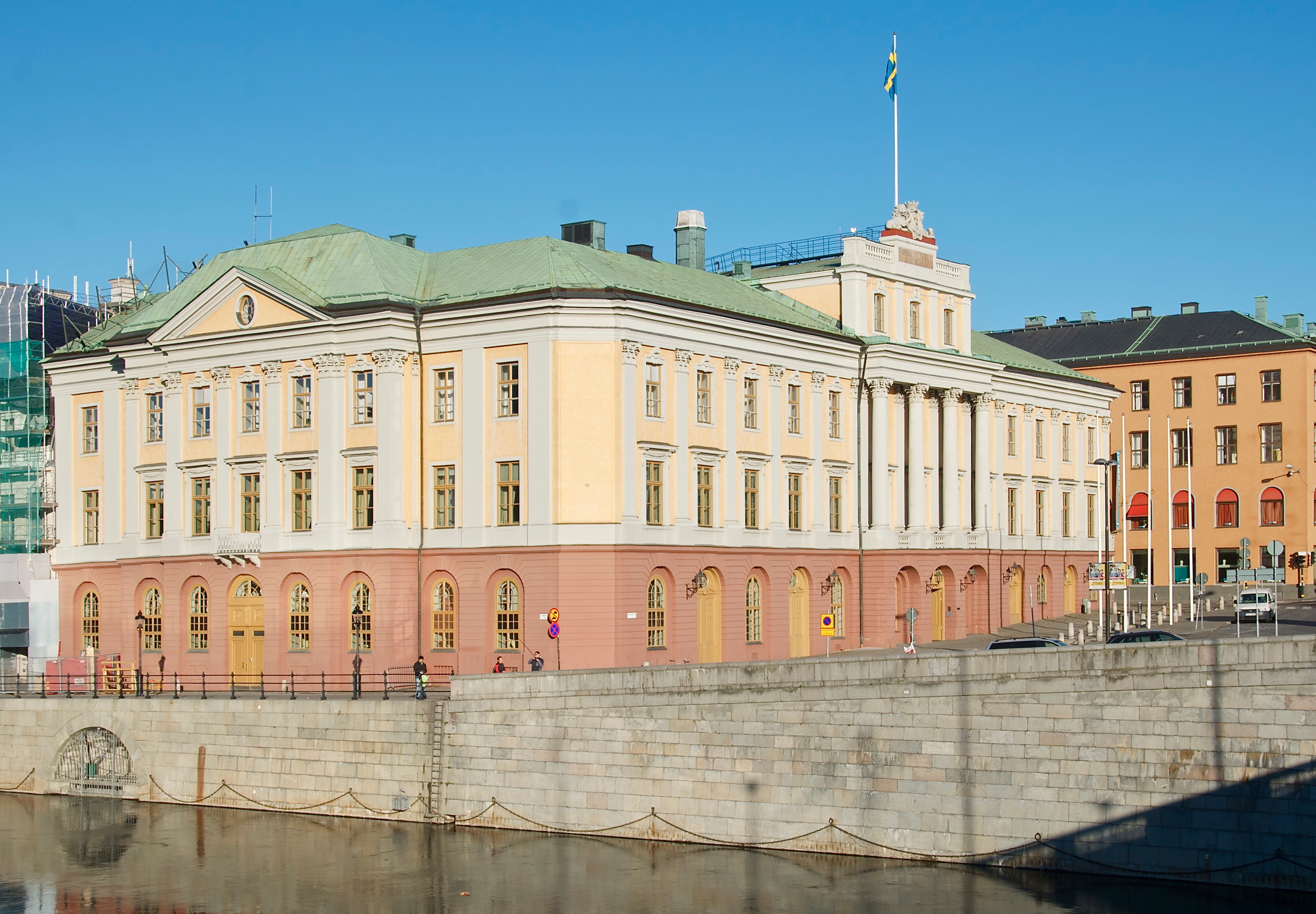
Arvfurstens Palace, Stockholm

Claes Grill (I) bought the palace in 1764, and lived there until he died in 1767, after which it was passed on to his wife Anna Johanna (I), and later their daughter Anna Johanna (II). In 1783, it was bought by Princess Sophia Albertina and converted into a part of the Arvfurstens palats. As of 1906 it houses the Swedish Ministry for Foreign Affairs.

=== Svindersvik ===
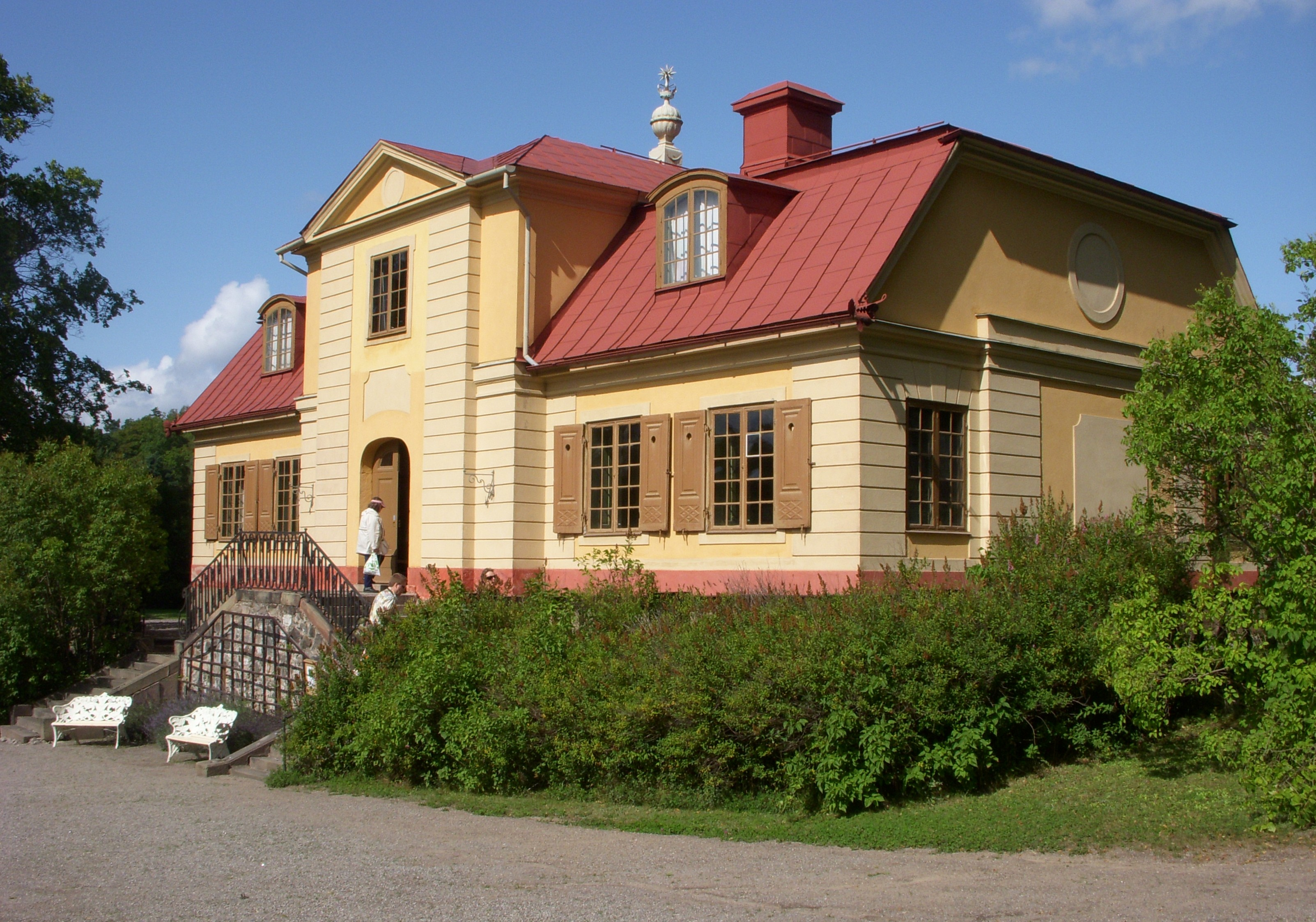
Svindersvik in Nacka

Built by Claes Grill (I), the residence was designed by architect Carl Hårleman in the early 1740s. It is one of Sweden's oldest preserved country residences. Claes and his wife Anna Johanna (I), would live in Stockholm during the winter and spend the summers at Svindersvik. The residence was usually accessed by boat. The style of the residence is rococo, with many Chinese elements. At the death of Claes (I), the estate was passed on to his daughter Anna Johanna (II). The house was sold in 1780, and passed through several owners until it was bought by silk manufacturer K.A. Almgren in 1863. As of 1949, the house is owned by the Nordic Museum.

=== Söderfors ===
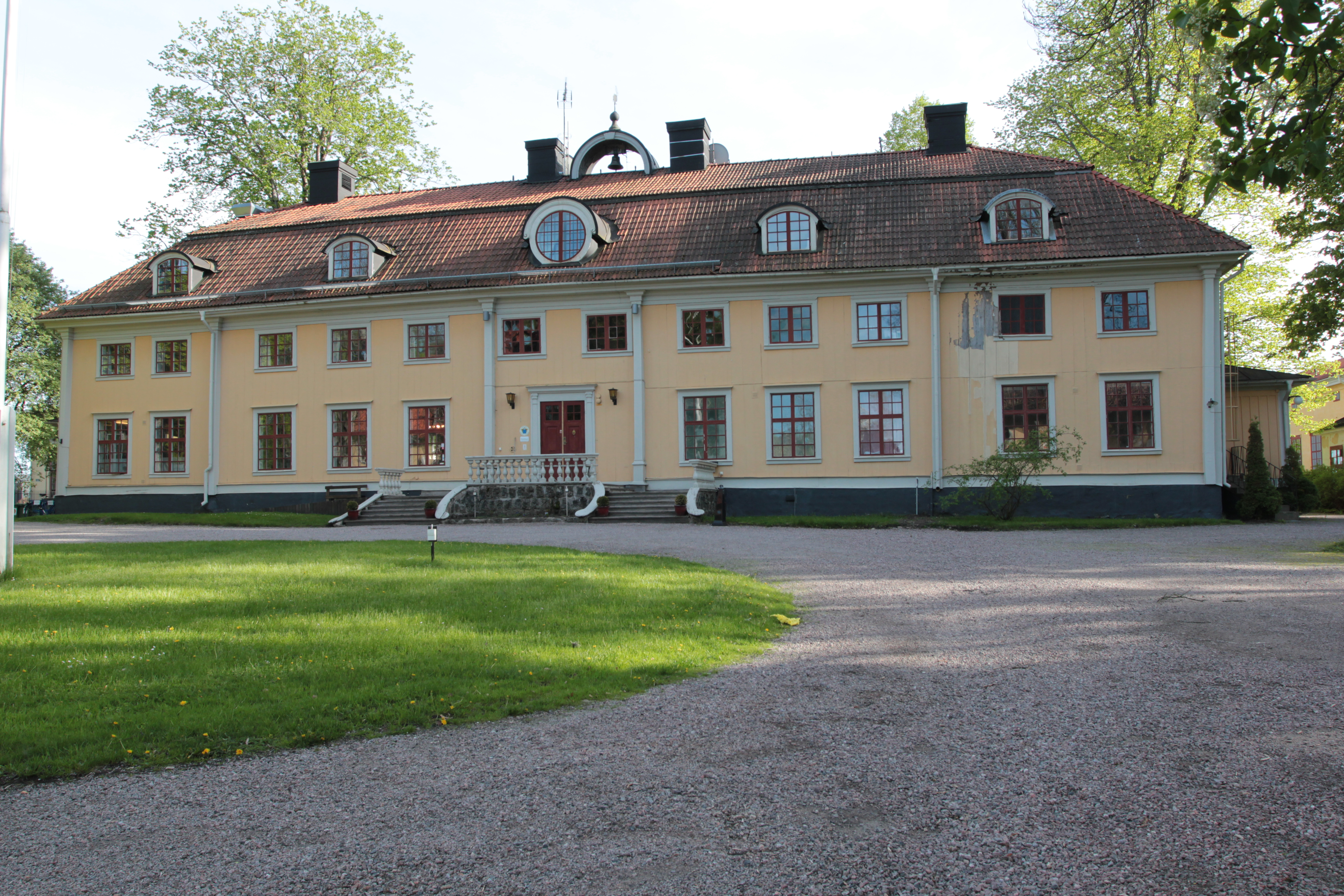
Söderfors manor, main building

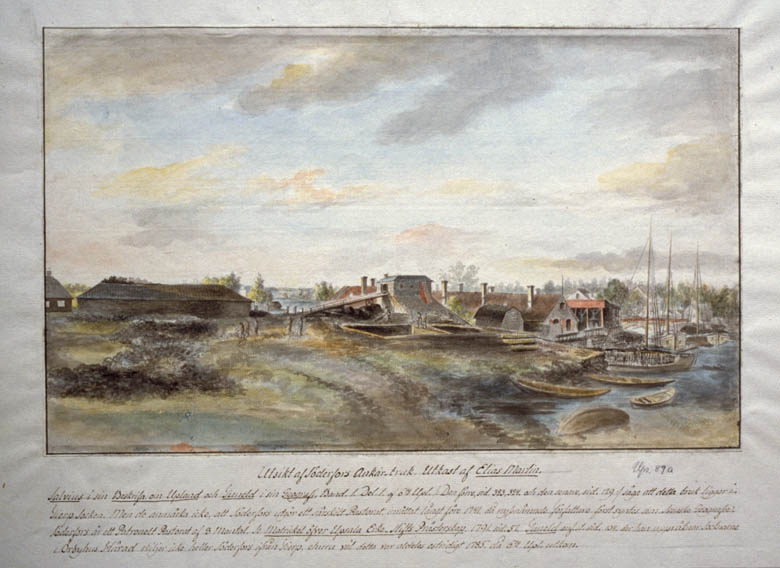
Söderfors ironworks, c. 1800 by Elias Martin

The Grill's estate in Söderfors largely made up the entire town at that time along with the ironworks and the manor. The ironworks was founded in 1676 to make anchors. Claes Grill (I) bought the ironworks in 1748, and it stayed within the Grill family until 1907. The factory passed through several owners and is, since 1995, owned and operated by Scana Steel Söderfors AB, a company with production in Norway, Sweden and China.

The first manor was finished in 1700, then rebuilt between 1749 and 1756 by architect Carl Hårleman for Claes Grill (I). After his death, the manor passed to his son Adolf Ulric. He was an avid naturalist and during his residence, he filled it with art and specimens of mounted animals, minerals, fossils and plants. Adolph Ulric had a separate house built for his collection in 1786. He also started the construction of an English garden at Söderfors by the river Dalälven. Gustaf af Sillén completed the park, which is one of the main features in Söderfors. As of 2014, the manor is a hotel and conference venue. On 20 December 1985, most of the ironworks and the surrounding area of Söderfors, a total of 91 buildings, became listed buildings, making it one of the largest listed sites in Sweden.

=== Österbybruk ===
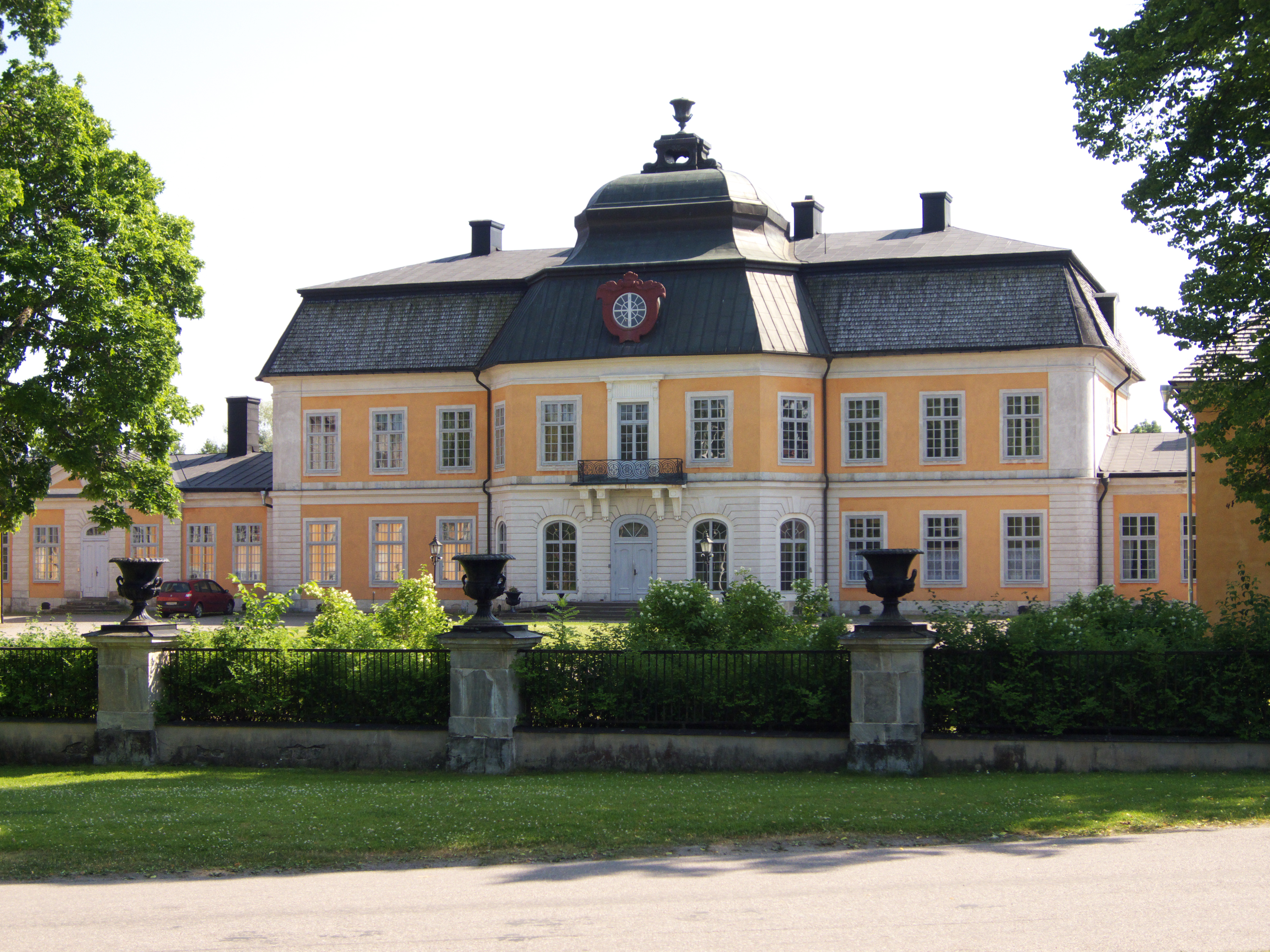
Österbybruk mansion, main building

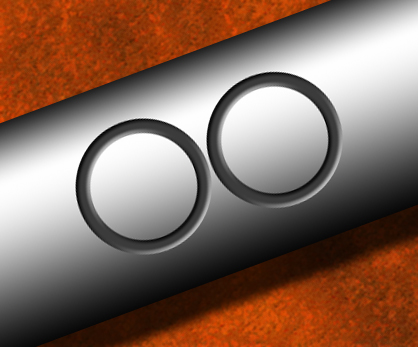
The "Double Bullet" stamp

The ironworks at Österbybruk was established by King Gustav I of Sweden with the help of German experts during the 16th century and specialised in making munitions. During the 17th century, the factories were merged with Lövsta and Gimo, under the directions of Louis De Geer, making it the second-largest ironworks in Sweden. Since De Geer recruited skilled ironworkers from the Walloon Region of Belgium, these ironworks became known as the Walloon factories ("Wallonbruken"). The iron ore processed in Österby came from the Dannemora mine and was noted for its purity. Iron bars produced at these ironworks were stamped with a "Double Bullet" mark, which guaranteed high and consistent quality. Such iron became reputable in England, where it was used by the steel industry in Sheffield. In 1758, the ironworks was sold to the Grill Trading house, at that time owned by Claes (I) and Johan Abraham. The trading house was discontinued with the death of Johan Abraham in 1799, and the ironworks was sold to Anna Johanna (III), the wife of Adolf Ulric. The factory passed through several owners until it was closed in 1983.

In 1763, Claes (I) started construction of the mansion at Österbybruk. The mansion incorporated the two wings already built in the 1730s; the west wing which served as housing for one of the ironworks caretakers and the east wing containing a chapel. The mansion was not completed until 1780, due to the decline of the East India trade, accusations of financial misconduct against Claes and Johan Abraham and the banking crises in Amsterdam in 1763. As of 2014, the manor is owned by the Bruno Liljefors Foundation. His studio in one of the buildings is preserved and is on occasion open to the public.

=== Iggesunds bruk ===
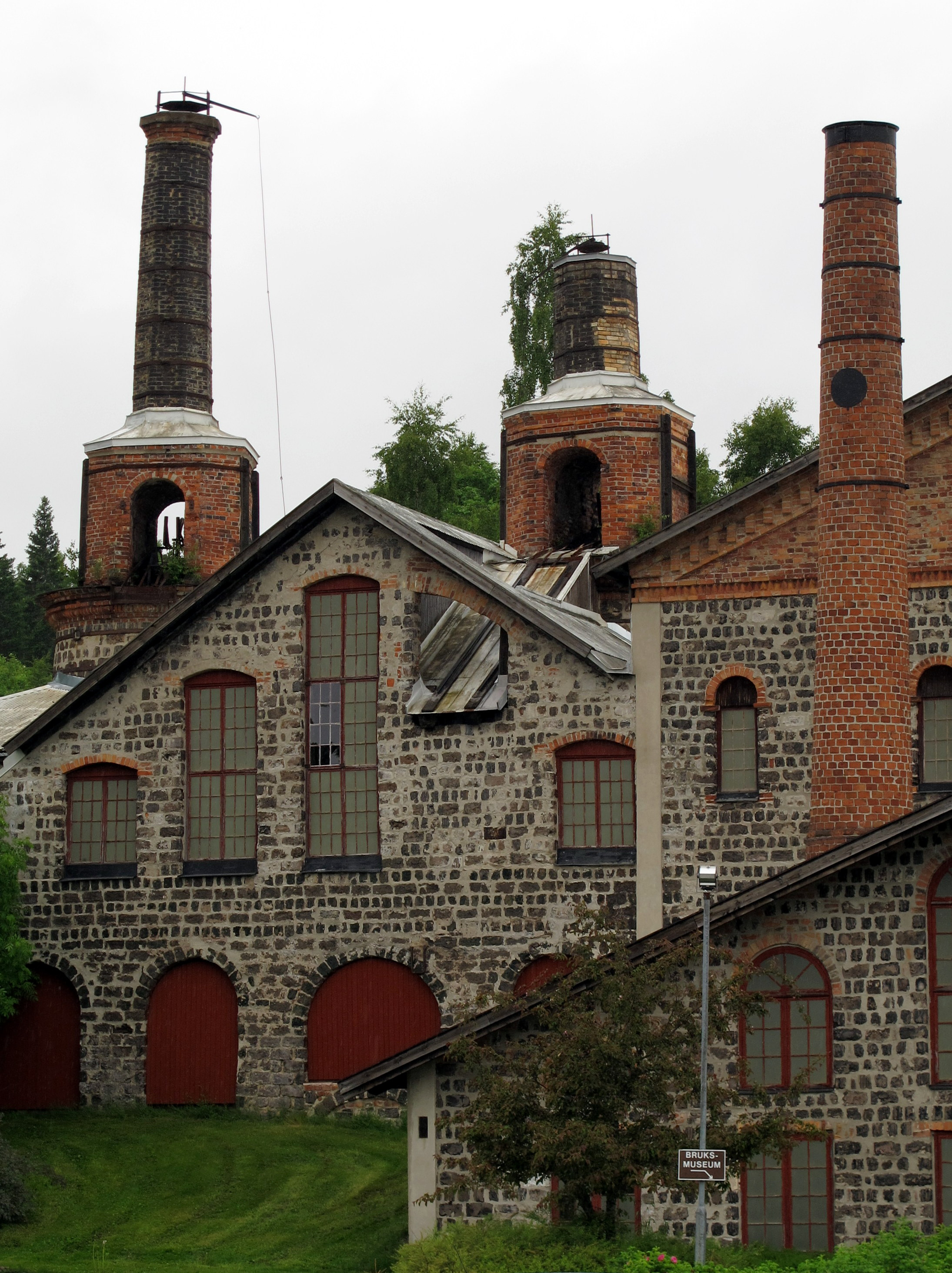
The 19th-century blast furnaces at the Iggesunds bruk

The ironworks at Iggesund is predated by a sawmill established by the Swedish state in 1572. The first ironworks were established in 1685, by the trader Isak Breant, the Elder. It included a blast furnace, a forge with a trip hammer and two finery forges. The iron ore came from Utö and the Dannemora mine. After the Russians burned Iggesund down during raids along the Swedish coastline in 1721, the ironworks was bought by the Grill Trading House. The Grills successfully ran and improved the factories during most of the 18th century. With the decline of the Trading House in 1800, the ironworks went through several owners until it was sold to the owners of Österbybruk at that time. During the 20th century, the ironworks were, through several owners, transformed and diversified into a sawmill, pulp and paper industry, chemical plant, dairy and agricultural companies. As of 1988, Iggesunds bruk is a part of Iggesund Paperboard.

=== Godegård ===
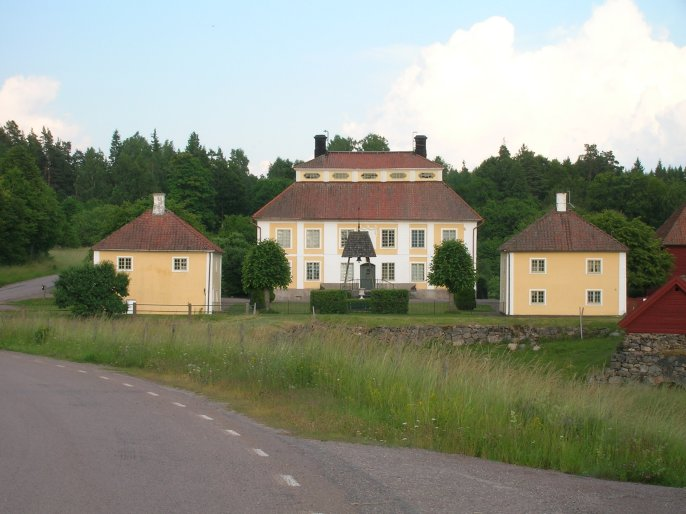
Godegård manor

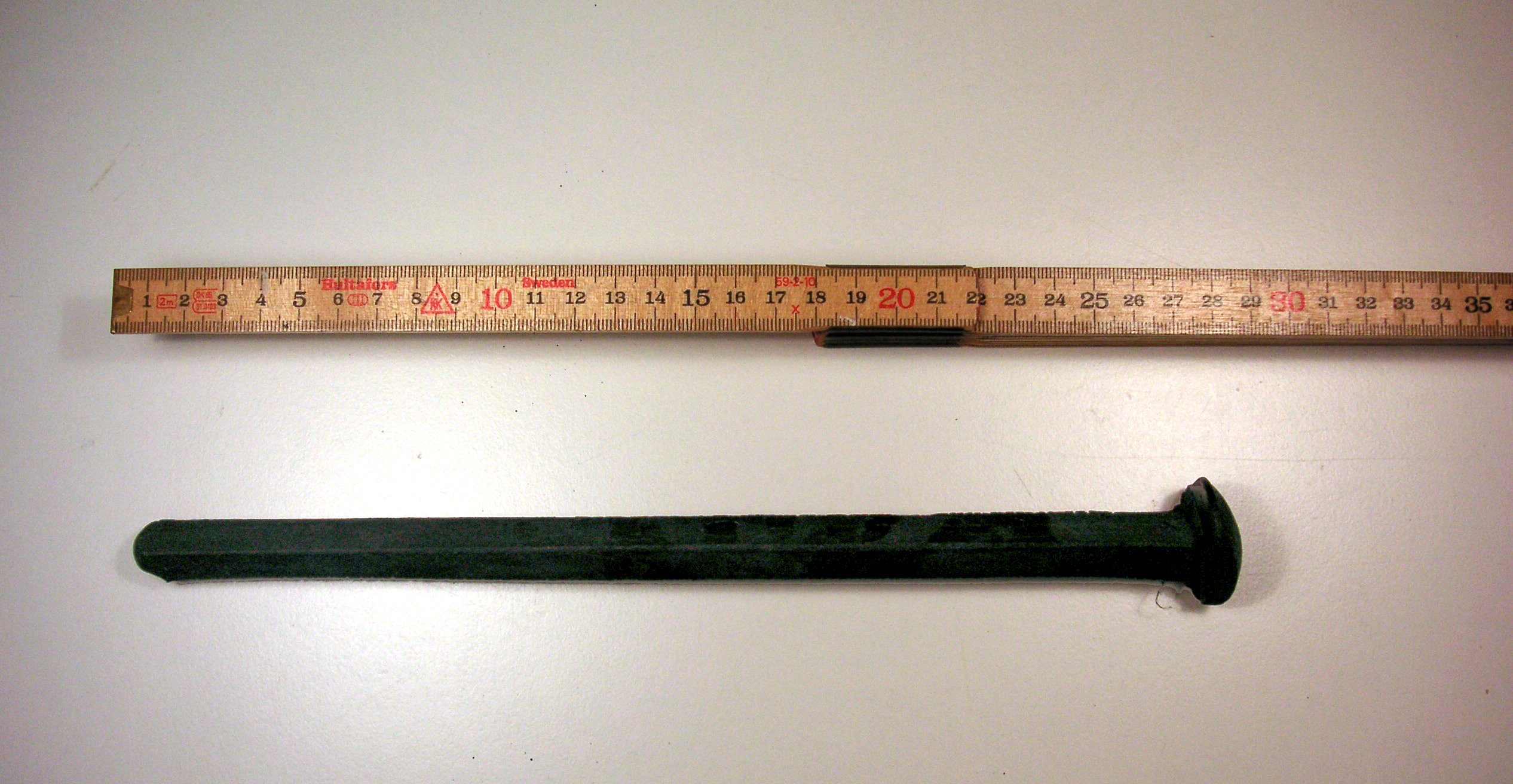
Hand wrought iron nail for the ship Götheborg III

The Grill's estates at the village of Godegård, the manor and the ironworks, dominated the community during the 18th century. Mining had been done in the area as early as in the Middle Ages, and by the early 17th century, an ironworks was already established at Godegård. The ironworks was bought by Louis De Geer in 1618. He improved and expanded the factories and recruited skilled Walloons ironworkers to teach the Swedes how to use a finery forge. When he died, the ironworks and the first manor passed on to his son Jean De Geer. After a fire in 1719, the new manor was built. It was completed in 1725.

Settling down in Sweden after his profitable journeys to China, Jean Abraham was looking for something to invest in. He started negotiations for the purchase of land, manor and factory at Godegård, at that time the largest ironworks in Östergötland, and bought them all in 1775. Jean Abraham continued the expansion of the ironworks and made a significant restoration of the manor. He also built an English garden, designed by Fredrik Magnus Piper, with several gazebos in a Chinese style. The ironworks was closed in 1896, but the manor remained in the Grill family until 1980. It became a listed building in 1977. Jean Abraham collected all of his letters, accounts and notes in an archive at Godegård, now known as the Godegård Archive. As of 2003, the archive, containing over 7,000 documents, is in the Nordic Museum. It has been digitized and is available online as a result of a request from the Macau Historical Archives in 2003.

=== Mariedamm ===
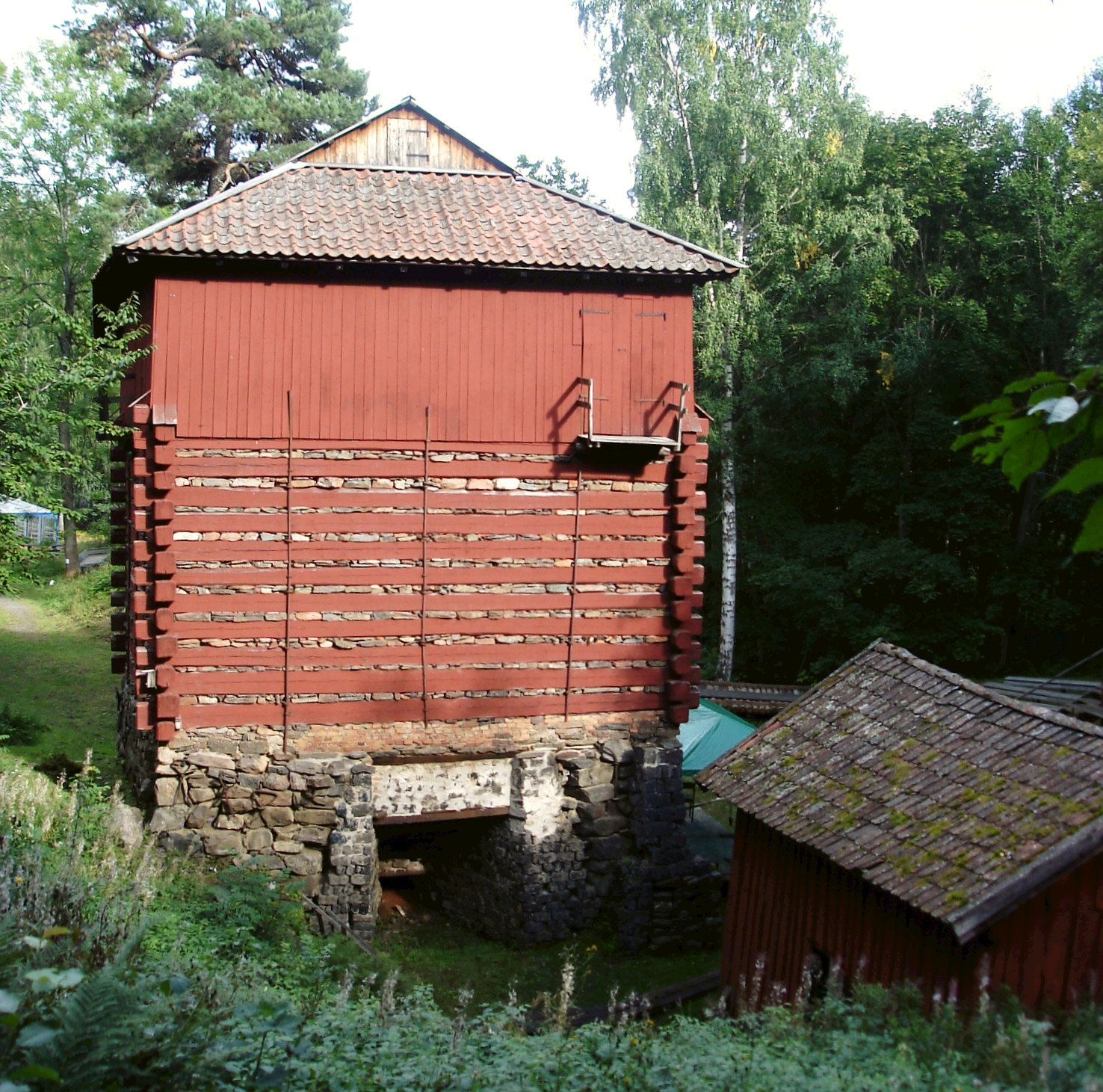
The Trehörnings blast furnace

The Trehörnings blast furnace in Mariedamm was originally built by local miners in 1636. Louis De Geer bought it in 1648, and it became part of the Godegårds ironworks which was sold on to Jean Abraham in 1775. The blast furnace remained a part of the Grill's estate at Godegård until 1888 when it was sold to the Skyllbergs bruk. The blast furnace was in operation until 1889. Since 1923, it is in being cared for and renovated by the Lerbäck Heritage society. At the beginning of the 19th century, a mansion was built in Mariedamm by the Grill family. The mansion was demolished in the 1920s, only one of the wings remain.

=== Garphyttan ===
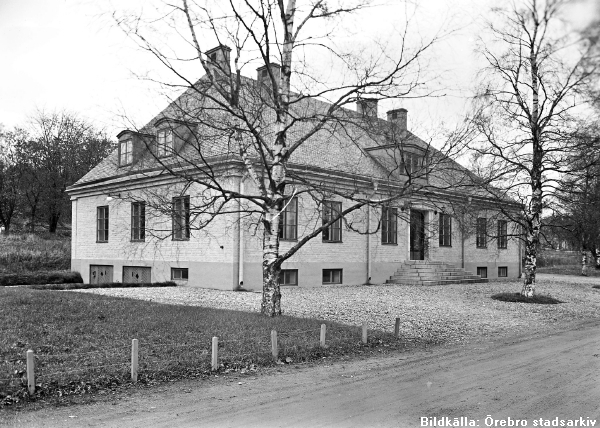
Administration building at Garphyttan.

The mining at Garphyttan was started during the Middle Ages by German miners. These were called "garps", a medieval Swedish word meaning "loudmouths" or "braggers". The main product was lead ore which also contained silver, but the yield from the ore was small and business faltered a number of times during the 17th century. It was not until the factory was bought by three Dutch merchants in 1661, that the company started to flourish again. A trip hammer, two hearths, a smithy, a sawmill, a silver refinery and housing for the workers were added. The factories and the ironworks went through several owners until 1773 when Abraham (III) acquired them all. The previous owner, Michael Grubb, had borrowed money from the Anthony Grill & Sons Trading House in Amsterdam, and when he failed to repay the loan in 1774, the factories became the property of the Grills. The building of a manor at Garphyttan started during the 17th century, and several additions were made in the middle of the 18th century. The main building of the manor was destroyed during a fire in 1830, only the four wings remain.

=== Stora Nyckelviken ===
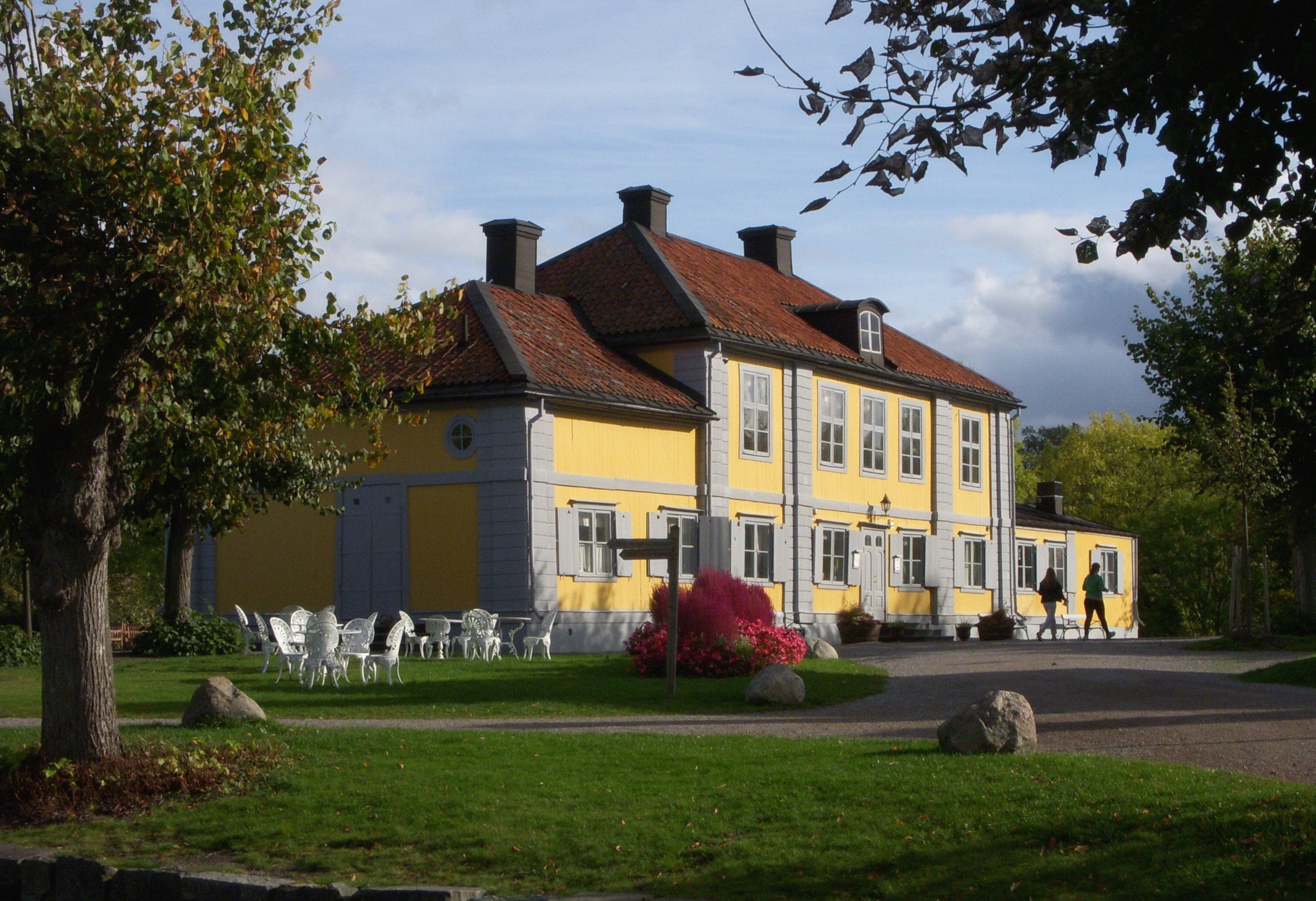
Nyckelviken manor, main building

Stora Nyckelviken manor was completed in 1746 by Herman Petersen, a wealthy merchant and director of the SOIC. The manor was designed in much the same style as the other manors built with the profits from the East India trade. It consists of a main building, wings, gazebos and a park. The manor was only owned by the Grill family for a short period of time. Jean Abraham Grill bought it in 1760 and sold it 20 years later. As of 2014 the manor is owned by the municipality of Nacka. It houses a restaurant and a conference venue.

=== Skebo and Ortala ===
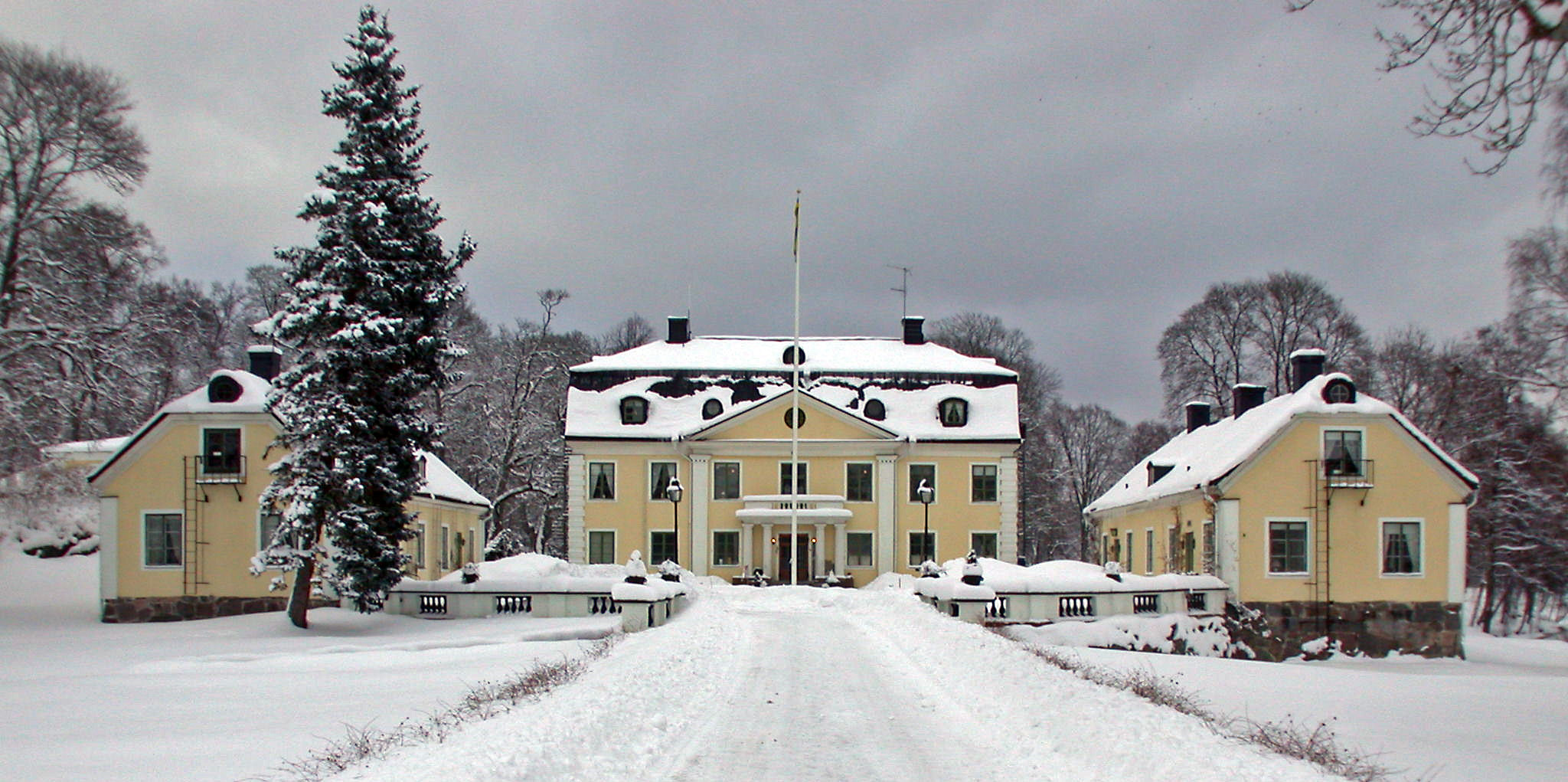
Skebo manor

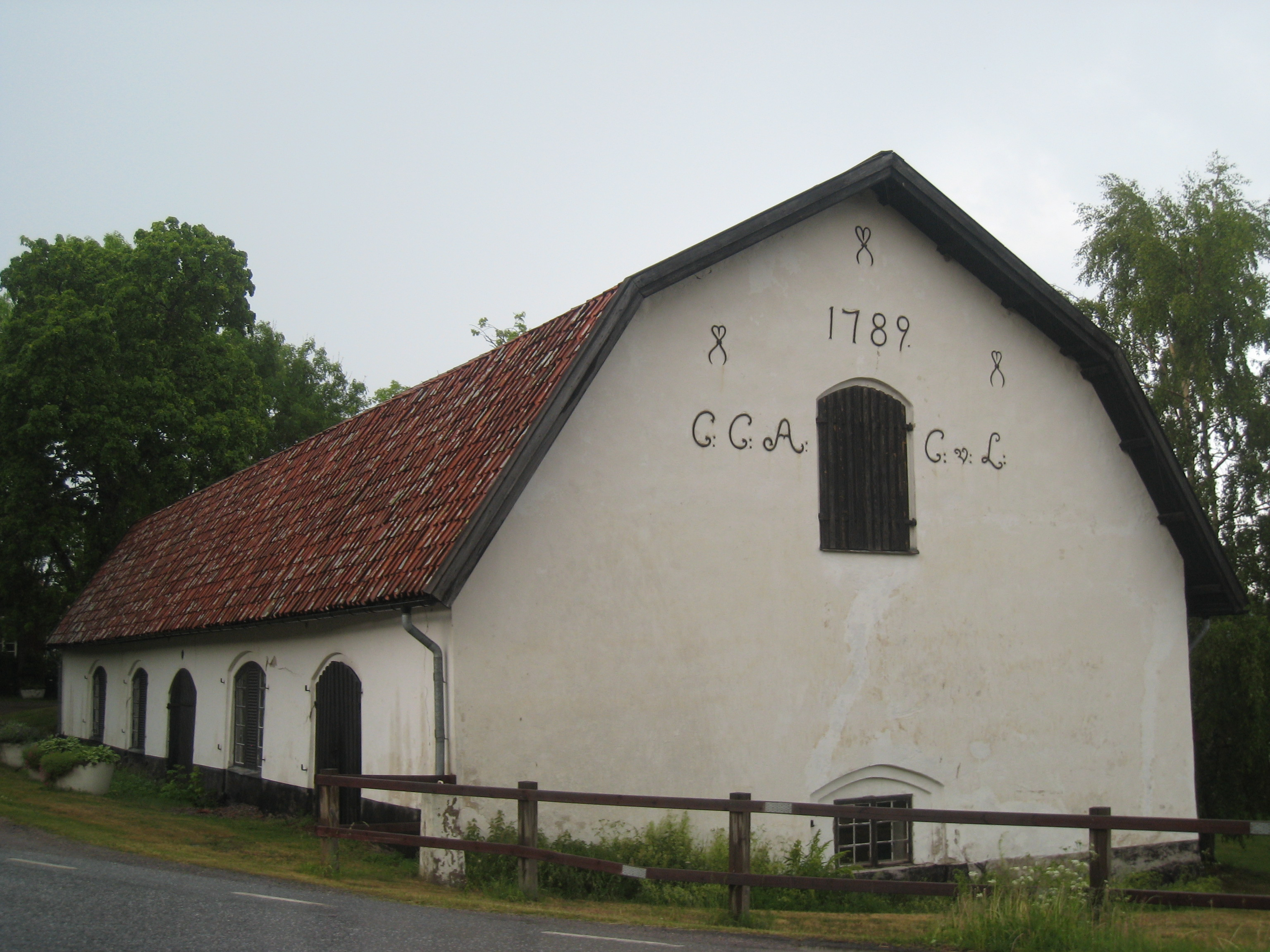
Coal storage at the Ortala ironworks

The first ironworks in Skebo was built in the 15th century. The iron ore was mined locally in the forests surrounding the factory. The first smithy with a trip hammer at Skebo, was constructed by Hindrich Lemmens in 1626. The iron from the ironworks was mainly sold to the Norrtälje rifle factory, which made weapons used in the Thirty Years' War. During the 18th century, the Skebo and Ortala (a similar mine and factory nearby) ironworks were operated jointly. They went through several owners, due to the economical entanglements and financial difficulties of the directors and investors. One of these affairs resulted in Jacob Grill obtaining Skebo and Ortala, along with three other factories in 1769, from the previous owner who could not pay his debt to Jacob. Jacob had no experience in operating an ironworks, he got into financial difficulties and had to sell the factories in 1782. The ironworks flourished during the 19th century and began to decline after 1900, ending in bankruptcy in 1924.

During his time at Skebo, Jacob built a manor in 1767–1770. During the 19th century, the new owners filled it with art and sculptures and it became a centre for local society. When the ironworks folded the manor became a retirement home for elderly gentlemen, a spa, a house for seminars and workshops, and in 2010, a noted restaurant listed in the White Guide 2012. As of 2013, the restaurant is closed and the manor is a temporary lodging for refugees seeking asylum in Sweden.

=== The Lövåsen lead and silver factory ===
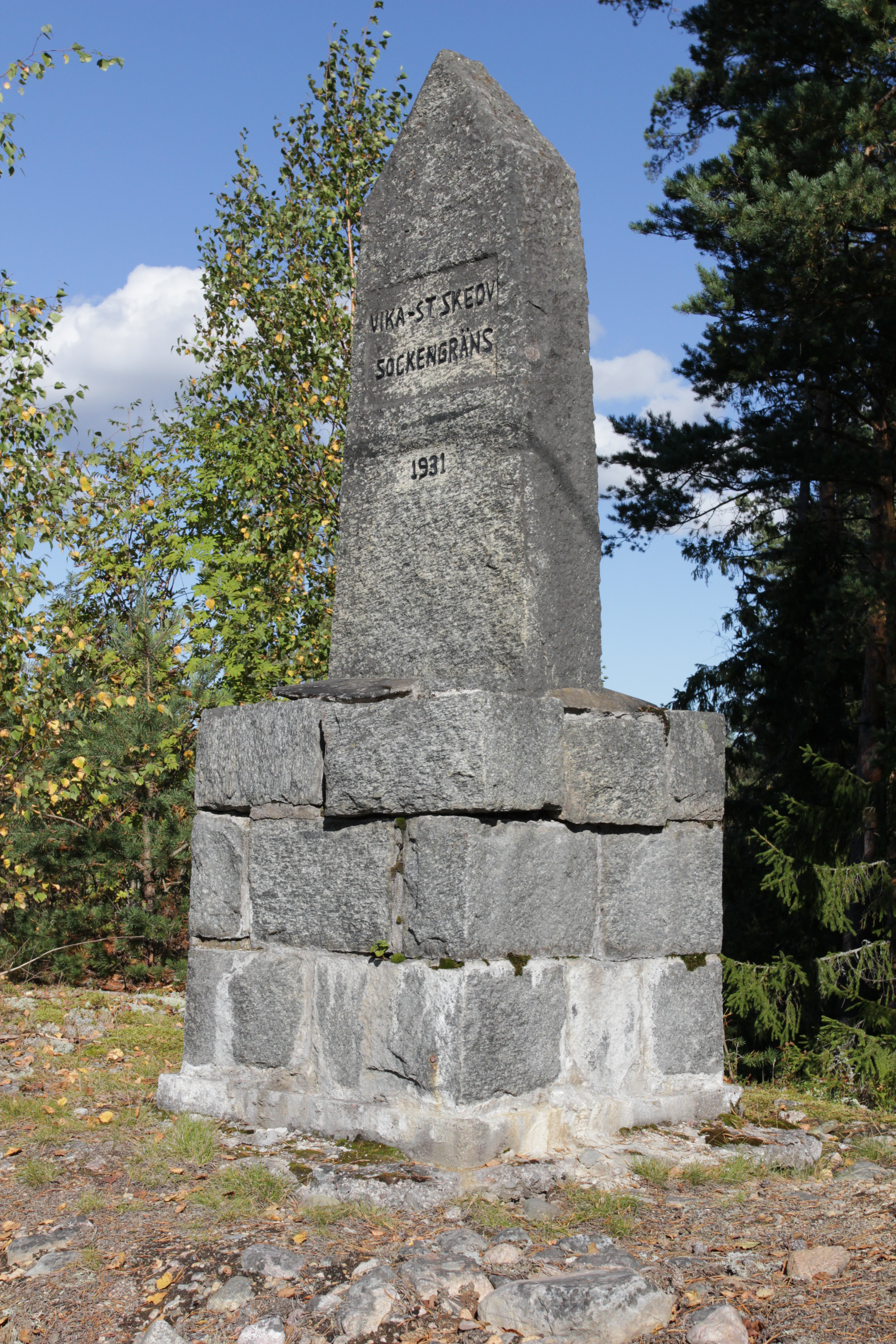
Marker at Stora Skedvi

The Lövåsen lead and silver factory in Stora Skedvi was one of the first factories to be connected with the Grill family. The Swedish government handed over the administration of the factory to Anthoni Grill (I) in 1656, to be used as a laboratory and workshop by him. He had claimed that he was in possession of a secret "matter" that would enable him to extract much more copper, lead, silver and gold from the ore than by other conventional methods. He experimented for some years in the laboratory, but he never improved the extraction process and was consequently demoted from his position at the mine. As of 2014, there are no visible remains of the mine or the factory.

=== Ersta ===
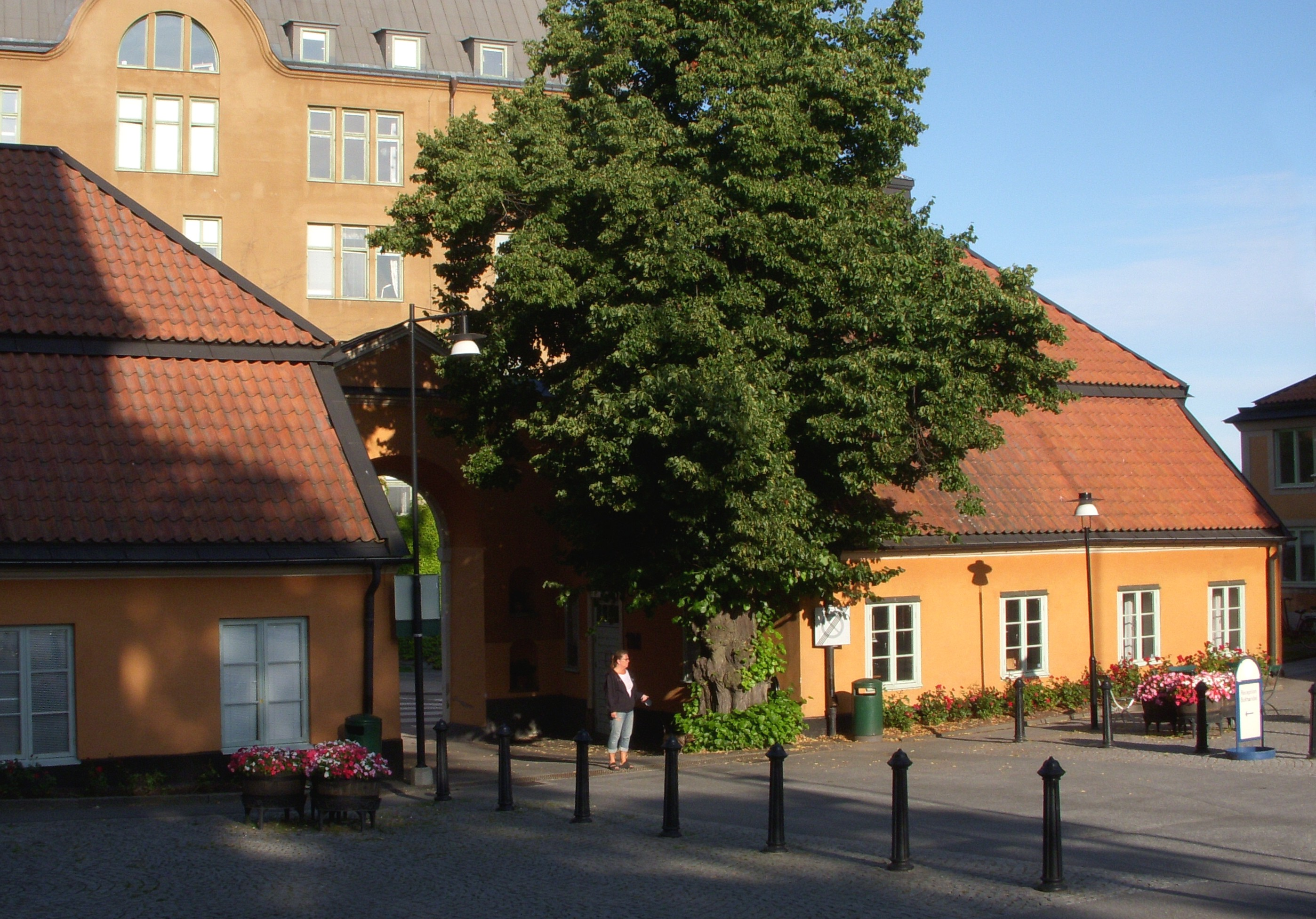
Ersta manor

Ersta is one of the many malmgårdarna (suburban manors) built in Stockholm during the 17th and 18th centuries. At these manors, wealthy, noble families from different parts of Sweden, could enjoy the same comforts as in their homes in the country. The manors were built in the suburbs, close to what constituted Stockholm in the 17th century and 18th centuries. The city has grown considerably since then, and these locations are now considered part of central Stockholm. Many of the buildings, the entire manor or part of them, are still in use and embedded in the modern cityscape.

Ersta, on the high cliffs of southern Stockholm, was probably built in the 1670s by brännvin manufacturer Oluf Håkansson. At that time the land in that area was cheap since it was close to the old gallows. When the gallows were moved further away from town to make way for a new shipyard, the Stora Stads wharf, where ships for the SOIC were built, the area around Ersta became sought after and was called "a garden". The mansion passed through several owners until Jean Abraham Grill bought it in 1755. In 1770, he established a crucible steel factory at Ersta with the help of Bengt Andersson Qvist, a member of the Swedish Board of Mines. Members of the Qvist family were inspectors at the Iggesund ironworks. The steel was of good quality, but nevertheless unprofitable. In 1775, Jean Abraham sold the manor and the steel factory to Qvist who ran the company until it folded with his death in 1799. As of 2014, only two of the buildings at the manor remain. They are a part of the Ersta Hospital and one of them houses the Ersta museum.
