= Adolf Ulric Grill =

Swedish ironworks owner and scientific collector

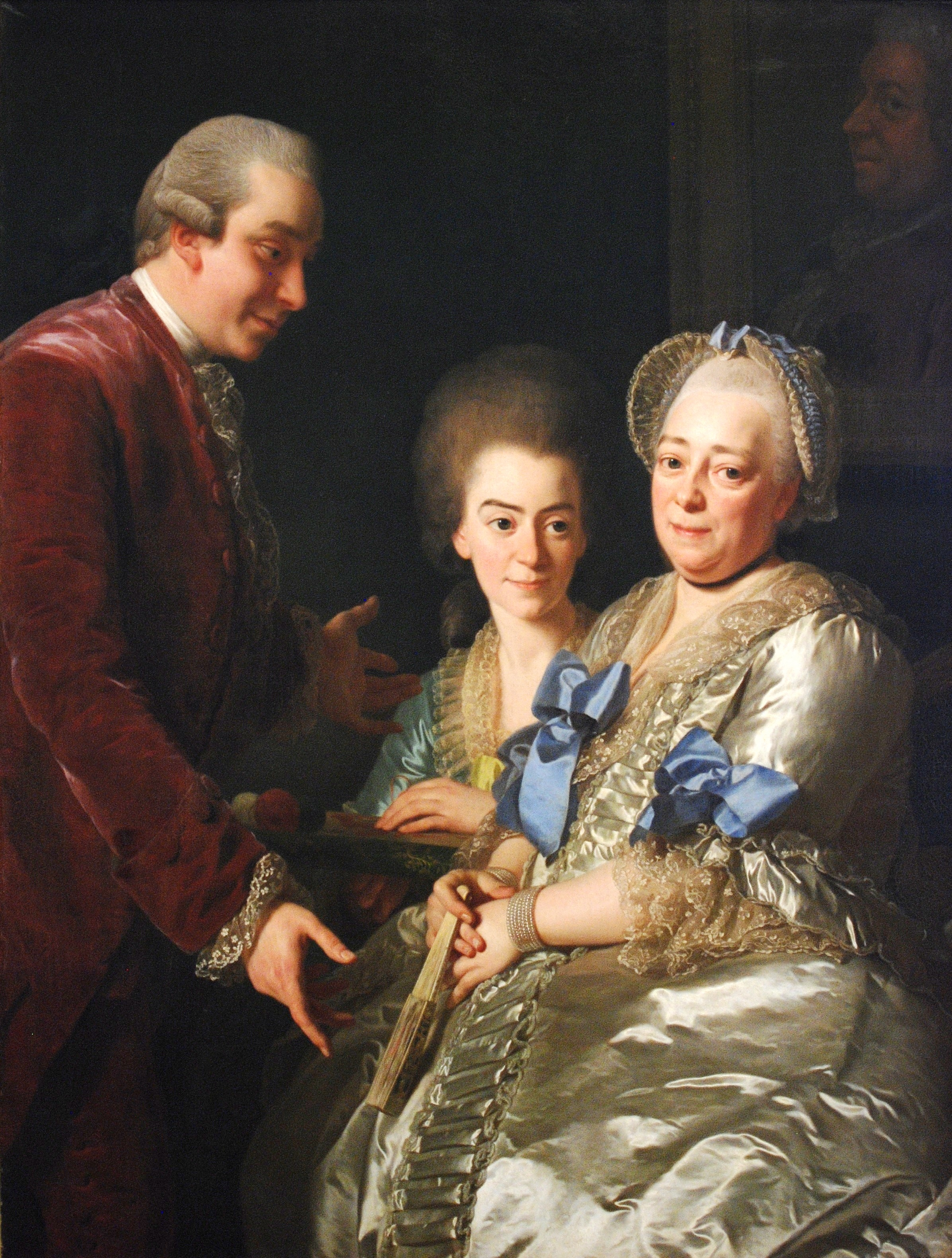
- Adolf Ulric Grill with his sister and mother. Painting by Alexander Roslin, 1775
- Born: Adolf Ulric Grill; 19 March 1752; Stockholm, Sweden
- Died: 1 October 1797 (aged 45); Söderfors, Sweden
- Occupations: factory owner, scientific collector, museum creator
- Spouse: Anna Johanna (1753–1809)
- Father: Claes Grill
- Relatives: Grill family

Adolf (Adolph) Ulric Grill (19 March 1752 – 1 October 1797) was a Swedish ironworks owner and scientific collector of animals and fossils for his cabinet of curiosities at Söderfors Manor, Tierp Municipality, Uppsala County, Sweden.

== Family ==
One of the notable Grill family, Adolf Ulric was the son of Claes Grill and Anna Johanna Grill. (Note: Daughter of Carlos Grill and Hendrica Meijtens, and granddaughter of artist Martin Mijtens the Elder.) He married his cousin, Anna Johanna (1753–1809) in Stockholm on 7 June 1778, they had one son who died at an early age. At the time of his marriage, he lived in the Grill House in Stockholm. He and his wife moved to Söderfors when he inherited the ironworks and manor from his father in 1767.

== Ironworks owner ==
Grill was a dedicated and hands-on owner of the ironworks at Söderfors, who supervised the operation and managed the books. Initially the factory's main products were anchors but with additions and improvements to the facilities he expanded into the production of wrought and pig iron amongst other goods. The products from the ironworks were of good quality and production peaked in 1780.

== Collector ==
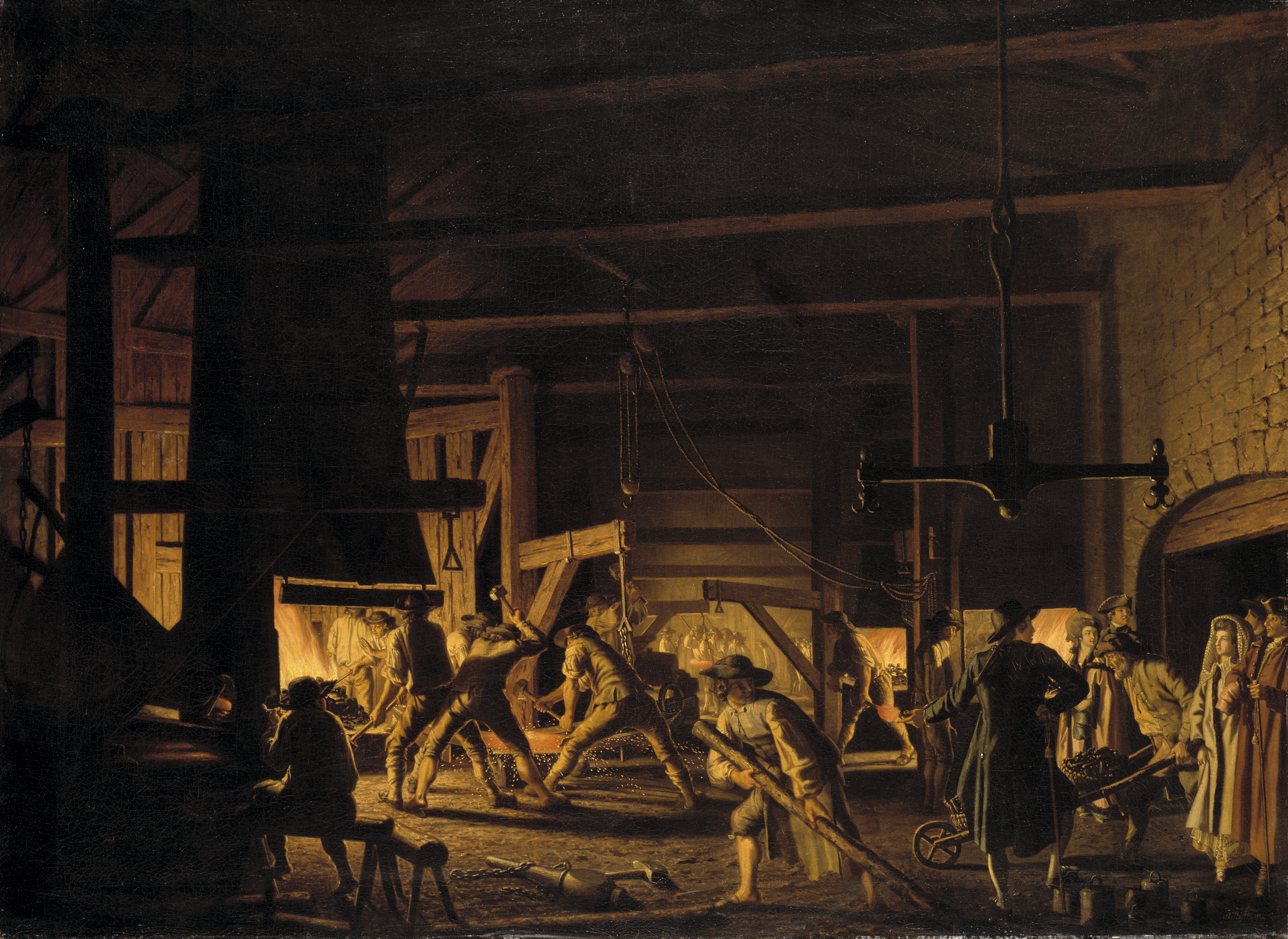
In the Anchor-Forge at Söderfors by Pehr Hilleström, depicting Grill on the right.

Like his father, he was a natural scientist and he collected mounted animals, fossils, minerals and plants in a museum, started in 1783, at the Söderfors manor. The first specimens were collected in the vicinity of Söderfors. After two years Grill moved on to the birds of the archipelago. He was able to use his connections through his relatives in the trading houses, to send for specimens from Greenland and China. The collections were also increased during his travels and on a journey to England in 1788, he traded a mounted moose for 60 rare birds.

In 1786, Grill built a separate house at the manor for the zoological collection. At that time it contained 116 mounted mammals, 600 birds, 700 seashells and 39 fishes. The collection was displayed as a full size diorama, the centerpiece being a cliff with mounted lions, tigers with cubs, leopards and a number of other animals surrounding the cliff, the largest being a sirenia. The museum was the largest collection in the Nordic countries at that time, it also received some international recognition. In 1793, Grill became a member, and preses in 1795, of the Royal Swedish Academy of Sciences for his work with the museum. In 1828, the collection was donated to the academy by the Grill family. As a tribute to him, the giant oarfish (Gymnetrus Grillii), (Note: The name was given in 1798, and has since been altered to Regalecus glesne.) was named after him.

== Builder ==
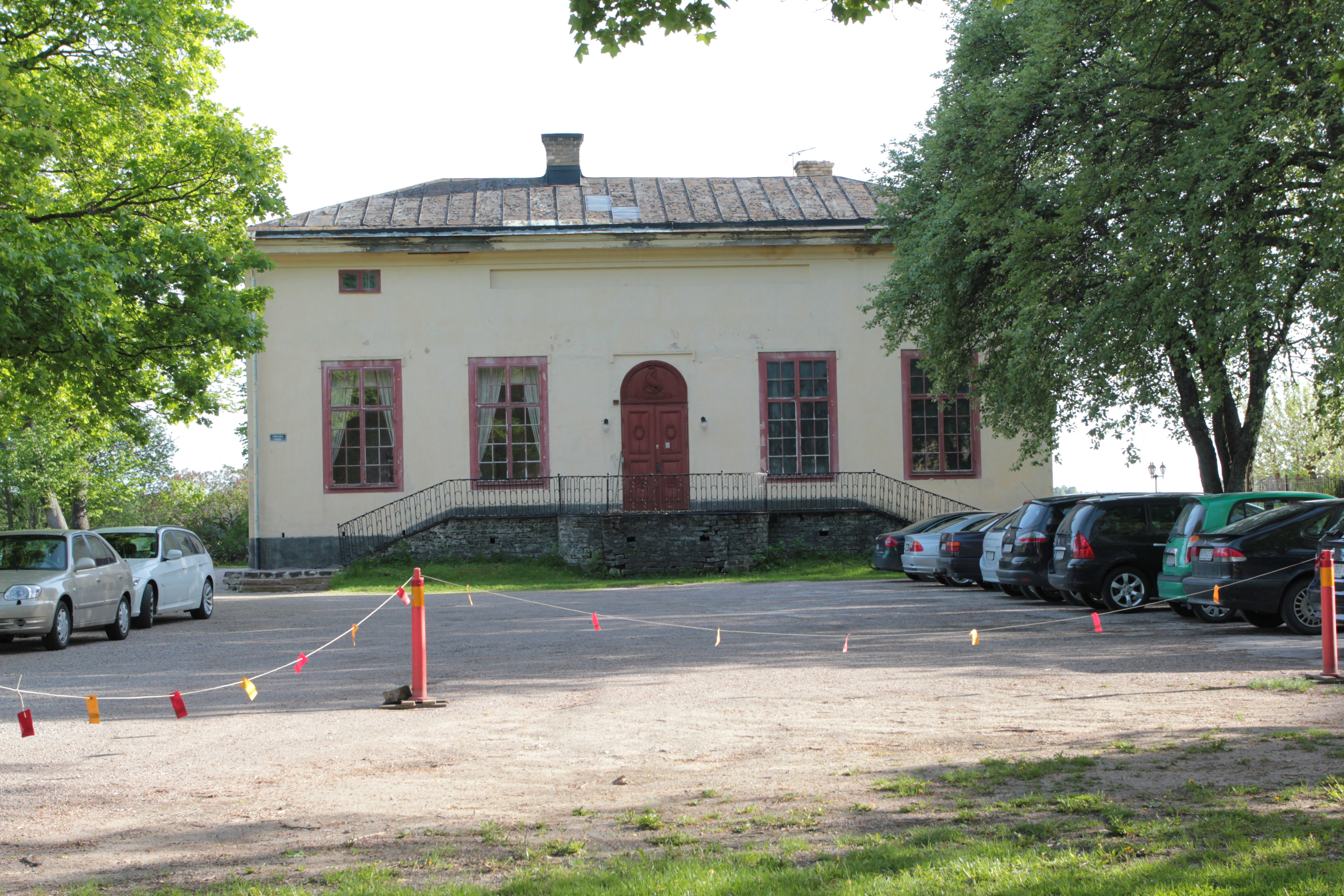
The house built for the zoological collection, the Grill House, in Söderfors

Grill paid for the building of a church in Söderfors that was inaugurated on 30 September 1792. Three years later, at a time of crop failure and famine in Söderfors, he started the construction of an English garden at the manor to provide jobs for the farmers in Söderfors and the neighboring Hedesunda socken. As a result, the park, a main feature in Söderfors, is sometimes called the Hedesunda brödkaka (the Hedesunda bread biscuit). Since 1998, the park has been included in the listed buildings of Söderfors.

Grill was known as a music lover and amateur composer. Wherever he lived, he organized well attended concert nights, with musicians invited from Stockholm. In 1772, he became a member of the Royal Swedish Academy of Music.
