= Skyllbergs bruk =

Swedish industrial company

Skyllbergs bruk is a Swedish industrial enterprise based in Skyllberg, Askersund Municipality. Tracing its origins to 1346, it is one of the oldest companies in Sweden.

== History ==
Skyllberg is mentioned for the first time in 1346, when King Magnus IV of Sweden donated iron manufacturing workshops in Skyllberg, Rönne and Åmme to Riseberga Abbey. During the Reformation, the works were expropriated by the Crown and in 1646 Queen Christina of Sweden donated Skyllberg iron works to Louis Fineman. It soon ended up in the hands of Fineman's partner Louis De Geer. It stayed in the De Geer family for five generations. Subsequently it belonged to the Burenstam family until 1888, when it was acquired by Ivan Svensson. The Svensson family still owns the company.

== Company activities ==
Skyllbergs bruk is an industrial enterprise with its origins in iron and steel processing. It remains the main focus of the company, and its activities in the area include robot welding, iron nail production and wire drawing. In addition, the company also engages in electricity production and sales (selling electricity to around 1,400 people) and owns and manages circa 1,600 hectares (6.2 sq mi) of forest and arable land. The company employs circa 150 persons (in 2016).

== Gallery ==
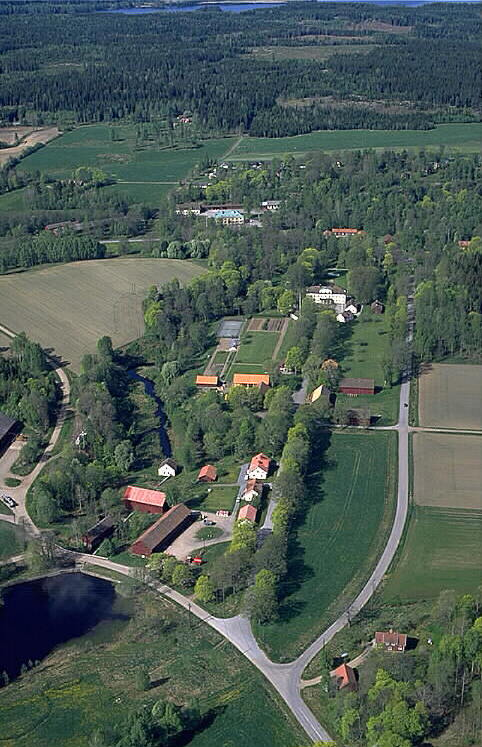
Skyllbergs bruk

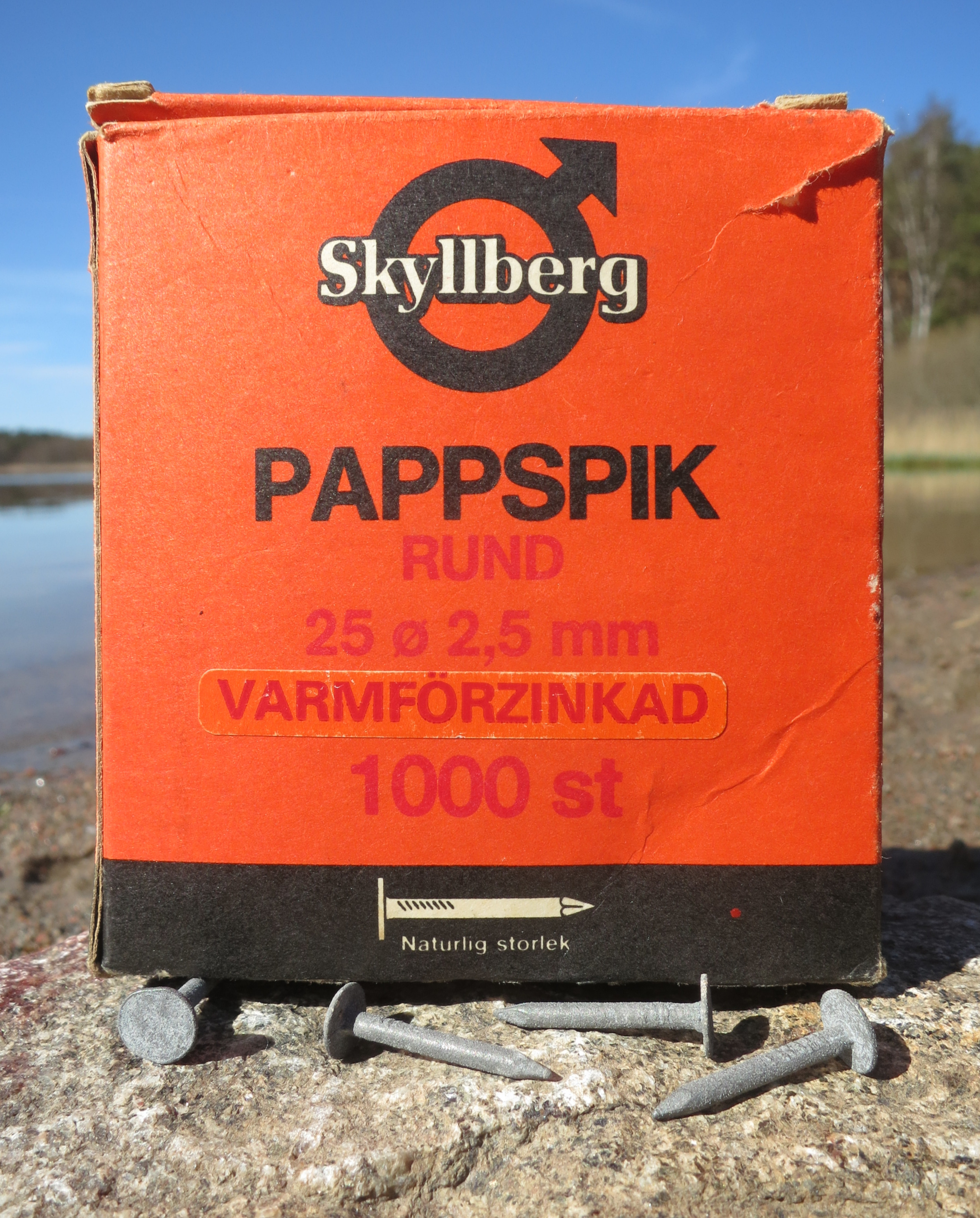
1970s hot-dip galvanized roofing nails by Skyllbergs bruk
