= Söderfors =

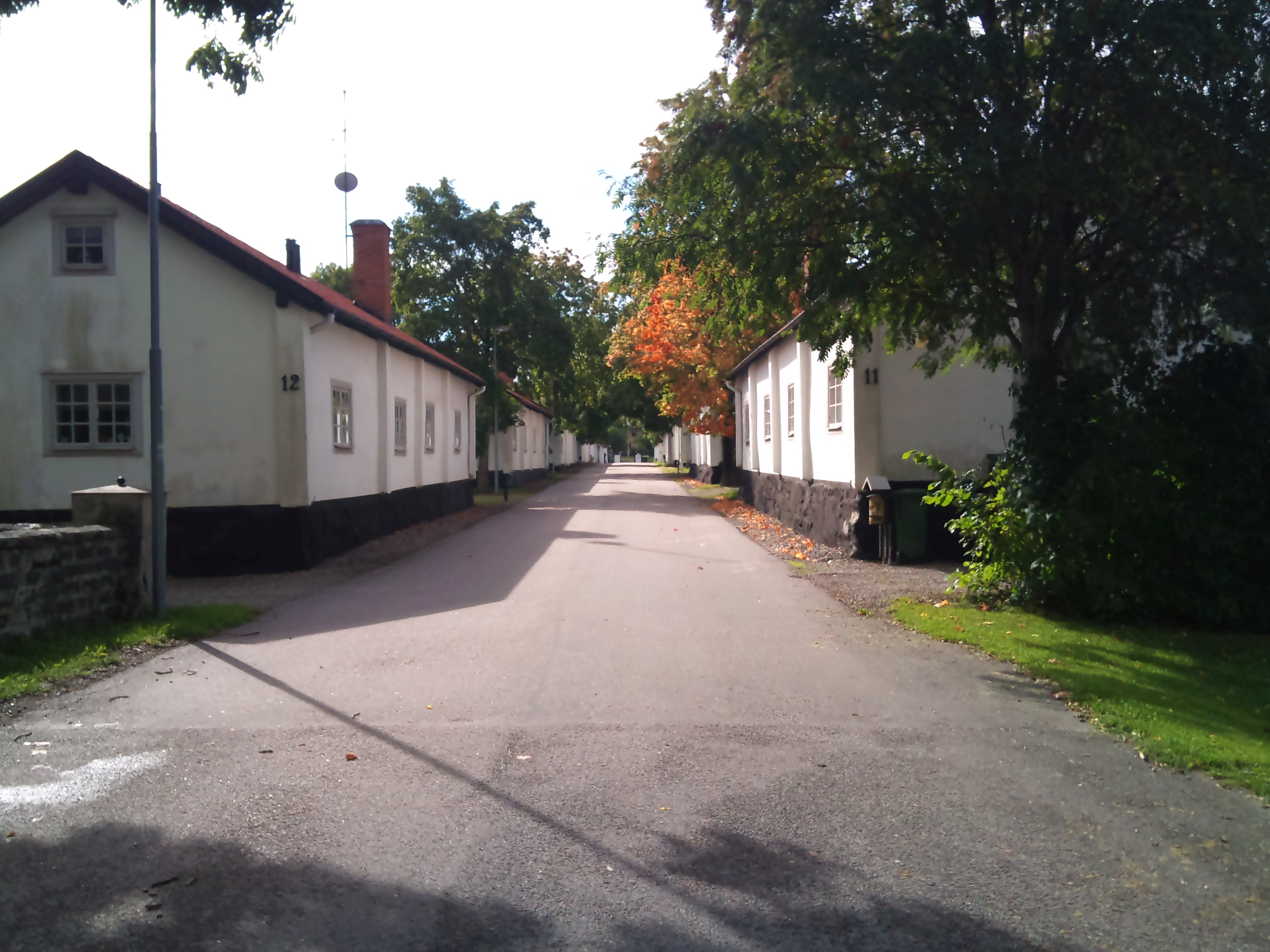
- Nygatan in Söderfors

- Location within Uppsala Location within Sweden
- Coordinates: 60°23′N 17°14′E
- Country: Sweden
- Province: Uppland and Gästrikland
- County: Uppsala County
- Municipality: Tierp Municipality

Area
  - Total: 2.27 km^{2} (0.88 sq mi)

Population (31 December 2020)
  - Total: 1,750
  - Density: 771/km^{2} (2,000/sq mi)
- Time zone: UTC+1 (CET)
  - Summer (DST): UTC+2 (CEST)

Söderfors (Swedish pronunciation: [sœdɛrˈfɔʂː]) is a locality situated in Tierp Municipality, Uppsala County, Sweden with 1,572 inhabitants in 2010.

Year	%	Votes	V	S	MP	C	L	KD	M	SD	NyD	Left	Right
1973	93.4	1,736	4.3	70.9		13.5	4.1	2.5	3.9			75.1	21.5
1976	94.4	1,707	3.1	72.2		10.9	6.5	1.9	5.3			75.3	22.7
1979	94.6	1,583	3.3	74.9		7.7	6.1	2.3	5.6			78.2	19.5
1982	92.7	1,544	4.4	76.4	0.5	6.5	2.6	2.0	7.2			80.8	16.3
1985	92.0	1,478	4.3	78.8	0.1	4.3	6.7		5.6			83.1	16.6
1988	89.1	1,392	4.0	75.1	2.6	3.9	5.7	2.5	4.7			81.8	14.4
1991	89.1	1,357	4.3	71.2	1.5	3.4	4.6	4.9	6.4		3.6	75.5	19.3
1994	89.0	1,294	4.3	76.3	1.6	2.9	3.3	2.6	7.5		0.7	82.1	16.2
1998	81.6	1,125	10.2	68.9	1.4	2.4	2.2	6.0	7.6			80.5	18.3
2002	79.1	1,077	6.8	73.0	1.0	2.8	4.3	5.5	5.4	0.9		80.8	17.9
2006	78.3	1,355	5.4	64.1	2.2	4.9	3.7	4.8	10.7	2.7		71.7	24.1
2010	81.5	1,399	6.4	58.7	2.2	4.6	3.0	2.9	14.4	6.8		67.3	24.9
2014	81.7	1,414	5.6	55.3	2.5	4.3	1.9	2.3	9.3	16.8		63.4	17.9
2018	77.1	1,269	7.5	43.2	1.9	6.9	1.3	3.9	9.4	24.4		59.4	38.1
