= List of people from Gothenburg =

This is a list of notable people connected to Gothenburg, Sweden.

== A–M ==
- Davida Afzelius-Bohlin (1866–1955) – mezzo-soprano concert and opera singer
- Daniel Alfredsson – retired NHL hockey player; long time captain of the Ottawa Senators and forward for the Detroit Red Wings; played from 1991 to 2014
- Helen Alfredsson – professional golfer; winner, 1993 Nabisco Dinah Shore
- Kwame Amoateng – footballer
- Ingelin Angerborn – children's author
- Margareta Arvidsson – Miss Sweden 1966, Miss Universe 1966
- Bjorn Ulvaeus – singer-songwriter; member of ABBA
- Jenny Berggren – singer-songwriter; founding member of Ace of Base
- Jonas Berggren – singer-songwriter; founding member of Ace of Base
- Linn Berggren – singer-songwriter; founding member of Ace of Base
- Joel Berghult – commonly known as Roomie; musician and YouTuber
- Olof Bergh - early Swedish-South African explorer (1643 - 1725)
- Torsten Billman (1909–1989) – artist
- Poul Bjerre (1876–1964) – psychoanalyst
- Viktor Blom – poker player
- Colin Campbell (1686–1757) – Scottish merchant and entrepreneur; co-founder of Swedish East India Company
- Arvid Carlsson (1923–2018) – winner, Nobel Prize in Medicine (2000)
- William Chalmers (1748–1811) – manager of Swedish East India Company; founder of Chalmers University of Technology
- Sir William Chambers (1723–1796) – Scottish architect
- Fredy Clue – artist and musician
- Ulf Dageby – rock musician
- John Darnielle – American singer-songwriter; wrote songs about Gothenburg
- Mikkey Dee – heavy-metal drummer
- Beatrice Dickson (1852–1941) – pioneering temperance activist
- Christian Djoos – NHL player, Anaheim Ducks
- Karin Dreijer – singer-songwriter
- Olof Dreijer – musician
- Gustavo Dudamel – Venezuelan conductor
- Ulf Ekberg – singer-songwriter; founding member of Ace of Base
- Hedda Ekman (1860–1929) – writer and photographer
- Jan Eliasson – former Swedish Minister of Foreign Affairs
- Loui Eriksson – National Hockey League player, Vancouver Canucks
- Louise Falkenberg (1849–1934) – philanthropist
- José González – musician
- Emma Green – high jumper, bronze medallist at the 2005 World Athletics Championships
- Lennart Green – world-class magician
- Gunnar Gren (1920–1991) – footballer; part of the Milan Gre-No-Li and 1958 FIFA World Cup runners-up squad
- Andreas Gustafsson (born 1981) – race walker
- Bengt Hallberg (1932–2013) – jazz pianist
- Victor Hasselblad (1906–1978) – industrialist; creator, Hasselblad cameras
- Anna von Hausswolff – musician
- Doris Håvik (1924–2009) – politician
- Håkan Hellström – singer-songwriter
- Mathilda Högberg – social media influencer
- Zeth Höglund (1884–1956) – founder of the Swedish communist movement
- Glenn Hysén – former football player, IFK Göteborg; father of Tobias Hysén
- Tobias Hysén – football player; son of Glenn Hysén
- Ingemar Johansson (1932–2009) – boxer; World Heavyweight Champion, 1959
- Jan Johansson (1931–1968) – jazz pianist; attended Chalmers University of Technology
- Kim Källström – football player; plays for Grasshopper Club Zürich in the Swiss Super League
- Marie Kinnberg (1806–1858) – pioneering female photographer
- Felix Kjellberg – YouTuber commonly known as PewDiePie; producer of Let's Play (video gaming) and Reaction (reaction videos) videos on YouTube Second channel to reach 100 million subscribers. Husband of Marzia Kjellberg
- Anna Kjellbin – professional ice hockey defender for the Toronto Sceptres
- Carl Klingberg – National Hockey League player, Winnipeg Jets; American Hockey League player, St. John's IceCaps
- John Klingberg – National Hockey League player, San Jose Sharks;
- Jacques Labouchere – singer-songwriter and guitarist
- Rekkles – professional e-Sport player
- Robin Lehner – NHL goaltender
- Jens Lekman – singer-songwriter
- Beatrice Lesslie (1890–1967) – ran the Gothenburg clothing firm Konfektions AB Lesslie
- Christina Lindberg – exploitation-film actress
- Gunnel Lindblom (1931–2021) – actress and director; cast in Ingmar Bergman's films
- Adam Lindgren – also known as Armada; professional Super Smash Bros. Melee player; currently ranked #2 in the world
- Mikael Ljungberg (1970–2004) – Greco-Roman wrestler; world champion 1993 and 1995; Olympic gold 2000
- Teddy Lučić – football player, formerly of the Swedish national team
- Henrik Lundqvist – NHL goalie
- Ludvig Engsund – Swedish ice hockey goaltender
- Magnus Mandersson – Swedish businessman
- Henry Mattson – painter
- Aleksandra Mir – visual artist

== N–Z ==
- Torbjörn Nilsson – former IFK Göteborg football player; part of the 1982 UEFA Cup winning team
- Stefan Olsdal – bassist in alternative rock band Placebo
- Christian Olsson (born 1980) – triple-jump gold medalist, 2004 Summer Olympics
- Elena Paparizou – Greek singer; winner, Eurovision Song Contest 2005
- Amanda Peralta (1939–2009), Argentine guerrilla fighter, later historian in Gothenburg University
- Sofia von Porat – cookbook author
- Laleh Pourkarim – Persian-Swedish singer-songwriter
- Timo Räisänen – indie-pop musician
- Mathias Ranégie – football player for Sweden National Team
- Lucas Raymond – NHL player for the Detroit Red Wings
- Arie Reich – Israeli legal scholar
- Niclas Sahlgren (1701–1776) – merchant and philanthropist
- Marcus Samuelsson – chef
- Torgny Segerstedt (1876–1945) – anti-Nazi newspaper editor-in-chief
- Justus P Sjöberg (JP Seeburg) – automated musical equipment manufacturer
- Jonas Sjöstedt – leader of Vänsterpartiet and former member of European Parliament
- Stellan Skarsgård – actor
- Bedřich Smetana (1824–1884) – Czech composer; lived in Gothenburg for a time
- Jonatan Söderström – avant-garde game developer
- Viktor Stalberg – National Hockey League player, Chicago Blackhawks
- Wilhelm Stenhammar (1871–1927) – composer
- Henrik Stenson – professional golfer; won FedEx Cup 2013; former world number 2 in official world golf rankings
- Elizabeth Stride (née Gustafsdotter) (1843–1888) – alleged third victim of serial killer Jack the Ripper
- Glenn Strömberg – former football player, IFK Göteborg
- Joakim Sundström – sound editor, sound designer and musician
- Jonas Svensson – professional tennis player
- Evert Taube (1890–1976) – author, artist, composer and singer
- Reorus Torkillus (1608–1643) – first Lutheran minister in New Sweden
- Ida Törnström (1862–1949) – painter, poet
- Björn Ulvaeus – singer-songwriter from ABBA
- Karl Valentin (1853–1918) – composer
- Alicia Vikander – actress
- Ljubomir Vranjes – former handball player; currently handball coach
- Daniel Wahlgren (Papa Dee) – musician
- Anna Wåhlin – Antarctic researcher, oceanography professor
- Hampus Wanne – handball player; currently plays for SG Flensburg-Handewitt
- Oscar Wendt – football player; currently plays for Borussia Mönchengladbach
- Alexander Westerlund – architect, industrial and furniture designer
- Hans Wieselgren (born 1952) – Olympic fencer

== Musical groups ==
- Ace of Base – pop group
- Amaranthe – dance/electronic power metal group
- Arch Enemy – melodic-death-metal group
- At the Gates – melodic-death-metal group
- AVATAR – melodic-death-metal group
- Dark Tranquillity – melodic-death-metal group
- Dead by April – melodic-metalcore group
- Deathstars – cybergoth industrial-metal group
- Evergrey – progressive-metal group
- Freak Kitchen – hard-rock/heavy-metal group
- Graveyard – retro blues-rock band
- HammerFall – power-metal group
- The Haunted – thrash-metal band
- In Flames – melodic-death-metal group
- The Knife – electro duo
- Little Dragon – electronic-pop group
- Nostradameus – power-metal group
- The Similou – electronic-music group
- The Soundtrack of Our Lives – rock group

== See also ==
- List of Swedish people
