= Colin Campbell (Swedish East India Company) =

Scottish merchant and entrepreneur (1686 – 1757)

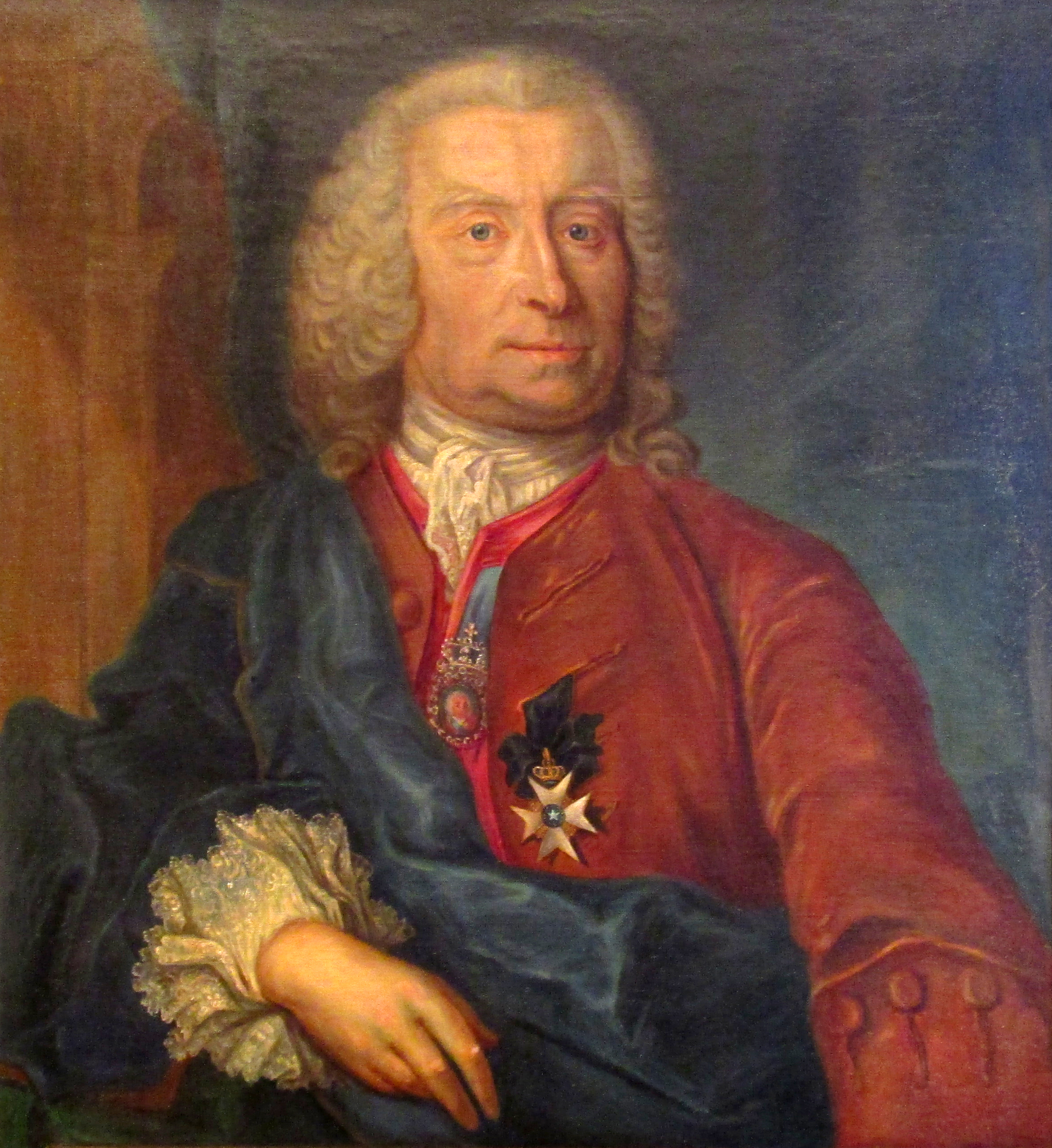
Colin Campbell, from a portrait now in Gothenburg Maritime Museum

Colin Campbell (1 November 1686 – 9 May 1757) was a Scottish merchant and entrepreneur who co-founded the Swedish East India Company and was Swedish King Fredrik I's first envoy to the Emperor of China.

== Early life ==
He was born in November 1686 to John Campbell, a lawyer and prominent citizen of Edinburgh and his wife Elizabeth Campbell of Moy, Inverness-shire. They were related to the noble family of Clan Campbell of Cawdor, later prominent in the Peerage. Colin was the youngest of three brothers (following Archibald and Hugh) and all followed their father in becoming notaries, merchants and prominent citizens. Colin became a Burgess of Edinburgh in 1720, when the citation described him as "of London".

== Ostend ==
In 1723, he lost a great deal of money and was left burdened in debt following the spectacular investments and subsequent financial collapse known as the South Sea Bubble. He vowed to repay all his debts, and did so before he died, but meanwhile had to flee from his debtors to Ostend in the Holy Roman Empire. This area was then part of the Austrian Netherlands, where Campbell helped the Austrians in their attempts to set up an Austrian rival to the British East India Company. He stayed there until 1730, mostly as a supercargo, accompanying ships and managing sales. The Austrian scheme was not a success, largely because of British opposition, so he moved to Stockholm, in Sweden. The following year he moved to Gothenburg, Sweden's premier port, where other Scottish merchants had been long established.

== Gothenburg ==
In Gothenburg, he entered into partnership with wealthy and well-connected Swedes. Henric König (1686–1736) was an import/export broker from Stockholm, from a family of German Hanseatic merchants, though now resident in Sweden. His brother, Christian (1678–1762) was secretary to the Chancellery Cabinet and through him Henric had contact with the King Fredrik I. Köning had been developing an East Indian trading scheme, along with Niclas Sahlgren, a merchant who had worked with the Dutch East India Company, and who had already been involved in a possible Swedish West India project. Campbell approached Sahlgren who invited him to Sweden.

=== Swedish East India Company ===
Campbell's Coat of Arms on Chinese porcelain in Gothenburg City Museum

In April 1731, the Riksdag (Swedish Parliament) approved the King's Charter giving the Swedish East India Company a monopoly of all Swedish trade with the "East Indies" (meaning any port east of the Cape of Good Hope ). The Company was expressly forbidden to trade in any areas under the control of other countries (for example Britain and the Netherlands) without their permission, and the "privileges" which the Charter gave them amounted to no more than "the common rights of nature and peoples" (as one commentator said) but the riches expected were signalled by the Company agreeing to pay the King about 25,000 silver dollars per voyage. And indeed the Company was successful, making the Directors (of which Campbell was one) very rich indeed. As only Swedes could be Directors of the Company, Campbell applied for naturalisation as a Swede (on 14 June 1731), and was raised to the nobility, with a coat of arms recalling his Campbell ancestry and a motto of "Memento Deus dabit vela" (Remember that it is God who fills the sails).

=== First Voyage to Canton ===
==== Ship and crew ====
The first voyage of the Company was that of the Fredericus Rex Sueciae, which set sail from Gotheburg on 9 February 1732. Colin Campbell was supercargo – carrying all the authority of the Company – to whom the First Captain, Georg Herman Trolle had to defer. There were a number of foreigners aboard the ship, including the Second Captain, George Kitchin, Mr Baron, Chief Mate and Hindric Bremer, Second Mate, the Chief Carpenter, Mr Brown, Jack, the ship's boy, and Daniel Campbell, James Moir and Gustav Ross, all assistants to Campbell, who was the First Supercargo. The Second, Third and Fourth Supercargos were Mr Graham (also called Brown), Charles Morford and John Pike.

==== Ambassador to China ====
Campbell also carried sea-passes and a passport which confirmed him as minister plenipotentiary to the Emperor of China, the Grand Mogul and other Asian princes – all issued in Dutch, in case they were stopped by that navy, which indeed they were. He never made contact with the Chinese Emperor or the Grand Mogul. He did though establish a long lasting and profitable connection between Sweden and Canton.

==== Voyage ====
The voyage lasted 550 days, with a stay of 120 days at Canton. In fact, the vast bulk of the Company's subsequent voyages went to Canton and only once or twice even approached the modern East Indies. She went by way of Norway, Cádiz and the Cape of Good Hope. Thence she went to St Paul, the Straits of Sunda and on to Canton, anchoring on 19 September 1732, six and a half months after leaving Sweden.

===== Dutch stop them =====
On the journey home, on 3 February 1732, they were stopped in the Sunda Strait by seven Dutch ships, whose officers refused to recognise the passes, evacuated the ship, put aboard a contingent of Dutch soldiers and ordered it to sail to Batavia, the headquarters of the Dutch. Only Colin Campbell was left aboard. At Batavia, the Governor General, Dirck van Cloon, examined Campbell's passes, apologised and allowed him to proceed on his journey, under escort, on 9 February. Campbell had kept a diary/account of the voyage, but had destroyed it at the approach of the Dutch, in case they would think he had been spying, and in case they found out any commercially sensitive information. Campbell had studiously declined to provide any information on his cargo. He reconstructed the diary mentally years later, and its manuscript was published in 1996.

==== Voyage home ====
They proceeded to Europe, stopping off at the island of Fernando de Noronha, off the coast of Brazil to replenish supplies and some recuperation from scurvy. On 7 September 1733, the Fredericus RS was once more in Gotheburg, eighteen months after it had departed. Campbell immediately set out a catalogue of complaints against the Dutch. A first dividend of 25% was declared for the shareholders of the voyage, followed by a second dividend of 50%. A very prosperous voyage, despite the Dutch.

=== Success, riches and death ===
Over 20 subsequent voyages took place over the next 15 years, and Campbell grew rich, before paying off all his debts and dying in 1757.
