= Swedish East India Company =

1731–1813 Swedish trading company

- Naval ensign (post-1746)
- Type: Chartered trading company
- Industry: International trade
- Founded: 14 June 1731; 295 years ago
- Defunct: 13 December 1813; 212 years ago
- Headquarters: East India House, Gothenburg, Sweden

The Swedish East India Company (Note: Standard Swedish: Svenska ostindiska kompaniet; abbr. SOIC.) was a chartered trading company based in Gothenburg, Sweden. Established in 1731, the company was entitled to conduct trade with India, China, and the Far East. The venture was inspired by the success of other European trading companies at the time. This made the city of Gothenburg a central hub in Europe for trade in Eastern products. The main goods were black pepper, spices, silk, tea, furniture, porcelain, precious stones, and other distinctive luxury items. Trade with India and China saw the arrival of some new customs in Sweden. The cultural influence increased, and tea, rice, arrack (a drink made from fermented sap or sugarcane) and new root vegetables started appearing in Swedish homes.

It grew to become the largest trading company in Sweden during the 18th century: a total of 132 expeditions were carried out with 37 different ships. The company folded in 1813; nevertheless, it left clear footprints that can still be seen in Gothenburg.

== Background ==
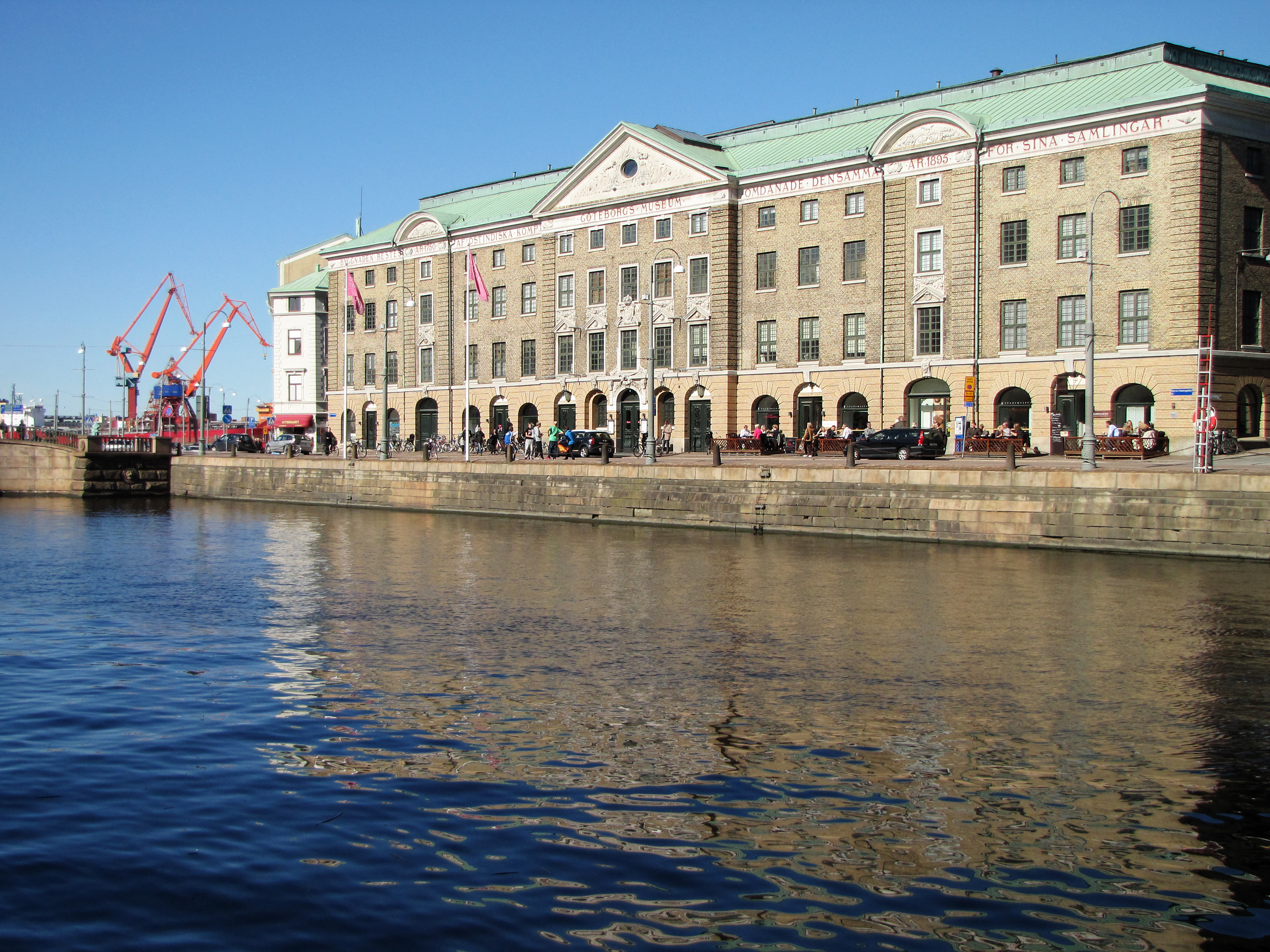
The East India House at Norra Hamngatan in Gothenburg, Sweden, built by the Swedish East India Company in 1750. The inscription on the frieze states: "This Building was erected in the year of 1750 by the East India Comp. The Gothenburg museum remodeled it for its collections in the year of 1895".

Sweden was the last of the more prominent seafaring European nations to engage in the East India Trade. The royal privileges for the Swedish East India Company (SOIC) were granted almost a century after the other European trading companies were established.

With the advent of the East India trade in the 17th century, Chinese and Indian goods were imported to Sweden. Drinking tea, wearing Indian Chintz clothes and having Chinese objects became the height of fashion among Swedish socialites and the middle class. Culture, philosophy, art, agriculture, and architecture were also studied and copied. The most prominent example of this is the Chinese Pavilion at Drottningholm, which was followed by smaller parks like the one built by Jean Abraham Grill at Godegård. This culminated during the 18th century, when many Swedish scientists and politicians even suggested that Sweden should be governed by intellectual bureaucrats, "mandarins", led by a sovereign king in a Chinese manner.

=== Early attempts ===
The first attempt of organizing a Swedish East India trading company was made by a Flemish merchant, Willem Usselincx. During the 17th century, the Dutch merchants dominated the newly founded Gothenburg on the west coast of Sweden. The town was considered ideal for Sweden's international trade since most of the goods were transported on ships and this was the only major Swedish port accessible without having to pass the Danish customs at Øresund. On 14 June 1626, Usselincx received royal privileges for a trading company for twelve years, from the Swedish King Gustav II Adolf. The privileges included clauses about the ethics of trading with foreign, indigenous people. The priority was to establish friendly, long-term relations that would be mutually beneficiary for both parties. The venture was supported by a number of prominent Swedes, including the King himself, but raising the necessary money proved harder. Political difficulties and Sweden's participation in the Thirty Years' War, where King Gustav II was killed, put an end to the plans. The resources were instead used for a smaller company, trading within Europe.

The next attempt to start a trading company was made in 1661, by German merchant Erlenkamp, who suggested a route over the Arctic Ocean, the Northern Sea Route, past Japan and further on to China and India. The aim was to bypass the Spanish and Portuguese blockades. The plan did not gain any support as the ice barriers proved even more difficult. At the end of the 1660s, a petition from diplomat and London resident Johan Leijonbergh was sent to the Swedish King Charles XI regarding one Olle Borg who had worked in the Dutch East India Company for eighteen years. Borg stated that if there was a war between Sweden and Denmark, he could deliver the Danish fort in Tharangambadi, India, to the Swedes. Knut Kurck, Peter Schnack and Johan Olivecreutz were appointed directors for the company, but the political unrest in Sweden at that time plus trouble with actually getting the money that had been promised from the investors thwarted this venture as well, and in 1674, the charter was dissolved. Residual resources were used to send two ships, the Solen (the Sun) and the Trumslagaren (the Drummer), to Lisbon for salt.

A later attempt to establish the Swedish trade on the East Indies was made by pirates sailing out from Madagascar. After having attacked other trading ships, they had become wealthy and were looking for a place to settle down and invest their money in legitimate enterprise. The pirates numbered about 1,500 and commanded a considerable and well-armed fleet of ships. They started by offering the Swedish King Charles XII half a million pounds sterling and 25 armed ships for his protection, but the matter was not resolved. In 1718, representatives for the pirates met again with the King at his camp during the campaign against Norway. The new offer was for 60 ships, armed and stocked with goods, if the pirates were allowed to settle down in Gothenburg and start a trade with the East Indies under the Swedish flag. One privateer by the name of Morgan actually obtained a charter for an East India Company and a letter of appointment for himself as governor over the colonies that could be the result of such an enterprise. When the King was shot and died on 30 November 1718, the venture folded.

=== Sweden after the Great Northern War ===
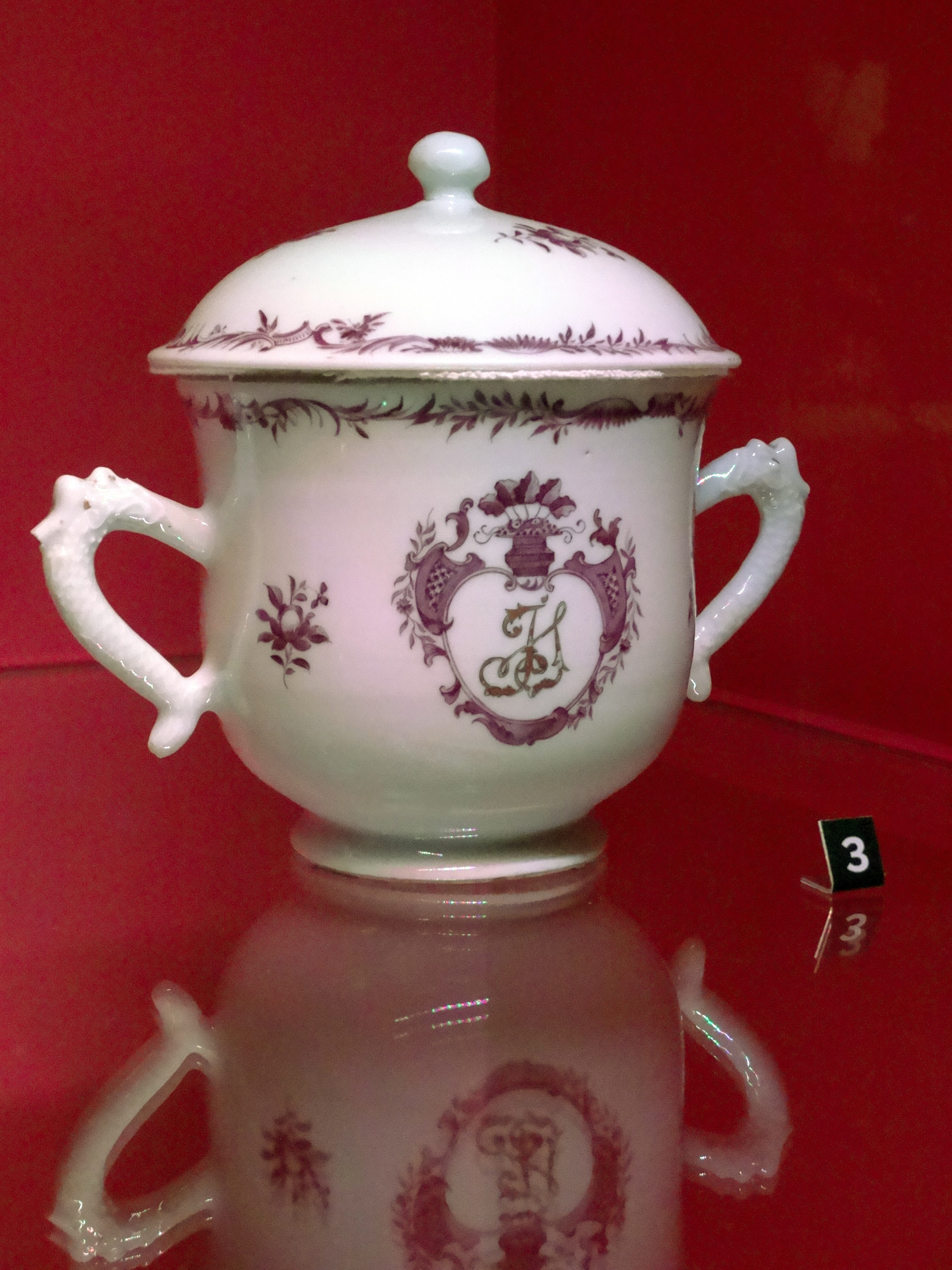
Porcelain sugar bowl made in China c. 1770–90, imported by the SOIC, City Museum of Gothenburg

Sweden was impoverished after the Great Northern War, and trade was seen as an option for rebuilding the country. Opinions about whether trade with the East Indies would be profitable enough diverged. The greatest concern was that Sweden would not have enough resources to defend the company's ships and trading posts. The trading companies from Britain, France, and the Netherlands did not hesitate to attack other ships to prevent competition. A failed attempt to start a competing trade company in Austria, the Ostend Company, was discouraging.

What finally made the Swedish venture possible was the strong support from foreign traders and merchants, foremost British but also Dutch, who had been shut out from the companies in their respective countries. The majority of the investors, as well as the buyers of the goods imported by the company, were foreigners.

Granting permission for a charter was not entirely uncontroversial during that time when mercantilism, which advocated regulations so that the production of export goods was promoted and import reduced, was the dominant idea for trade. Opposition became even more apparent after the first journey made by the ship Friedericus Rex Sueciaes in 1735. Demands were made in the Riksdag for sanctions and restrictions for the trade company, a number of pamphlets were written, arguing that Swedish steel and timber were wastefully being exchanged for such "worthless goods" as tea and porcelain. (Note: Contemporary arguments pro and con concerning the Swedish East India Company (SOIC) are examined in the last chapter of Christian Koninckx.) One of the most ardent critics against the charter was Johan Arckenholtz. He even spoke of the moral aspects, saying that the Swedish population "would be weaned from work and crafts and lose their health, strength and spirit by using products from a warmer climate".

The emerging Swedish textile industry was also threatened by the trade, and the new company soon promised to refrain from shipping textiles. Of sixty-one successfully returning voyages between 1733 and 1767, only three (in 1735, 1740, and 1742) carried cotton and silk textiles and raw silk from Bengal. (Note: Koninckx, quoted in "The European Trading Companies".) Some opposition may have been rooted in pure jealousy of the profits the SOIC were making from the trade. Those who supported the establishing of a Swedish trade company argued that if people wanted goods from China, they were going to buy them anyway and it would be better to import them using Swedish ships and trading company, and thereby keep the profits within Sweden.

== Establishing the SOIC ==
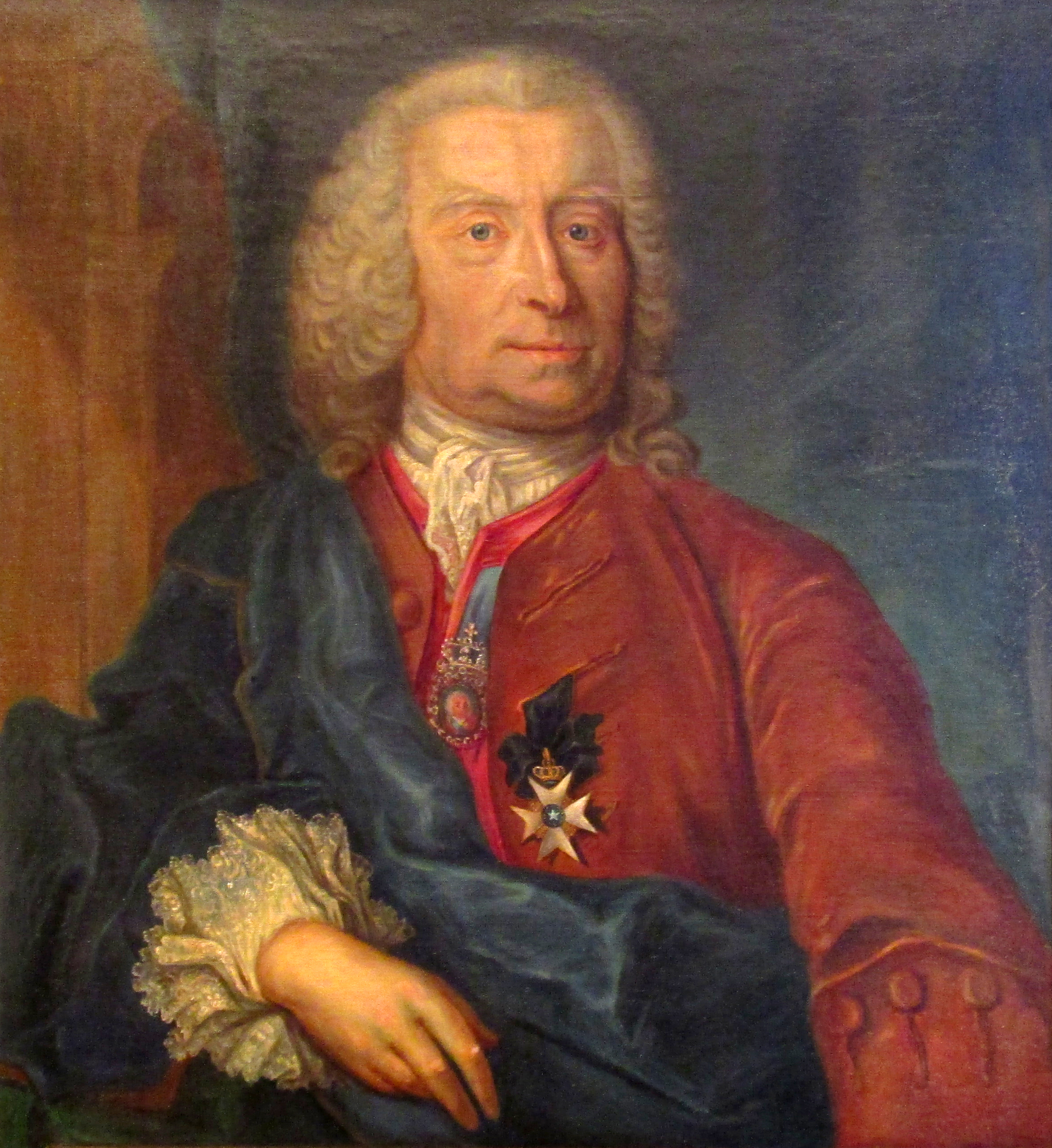
Colin Campbell (1686–1757), co-founder and director of the SOIC

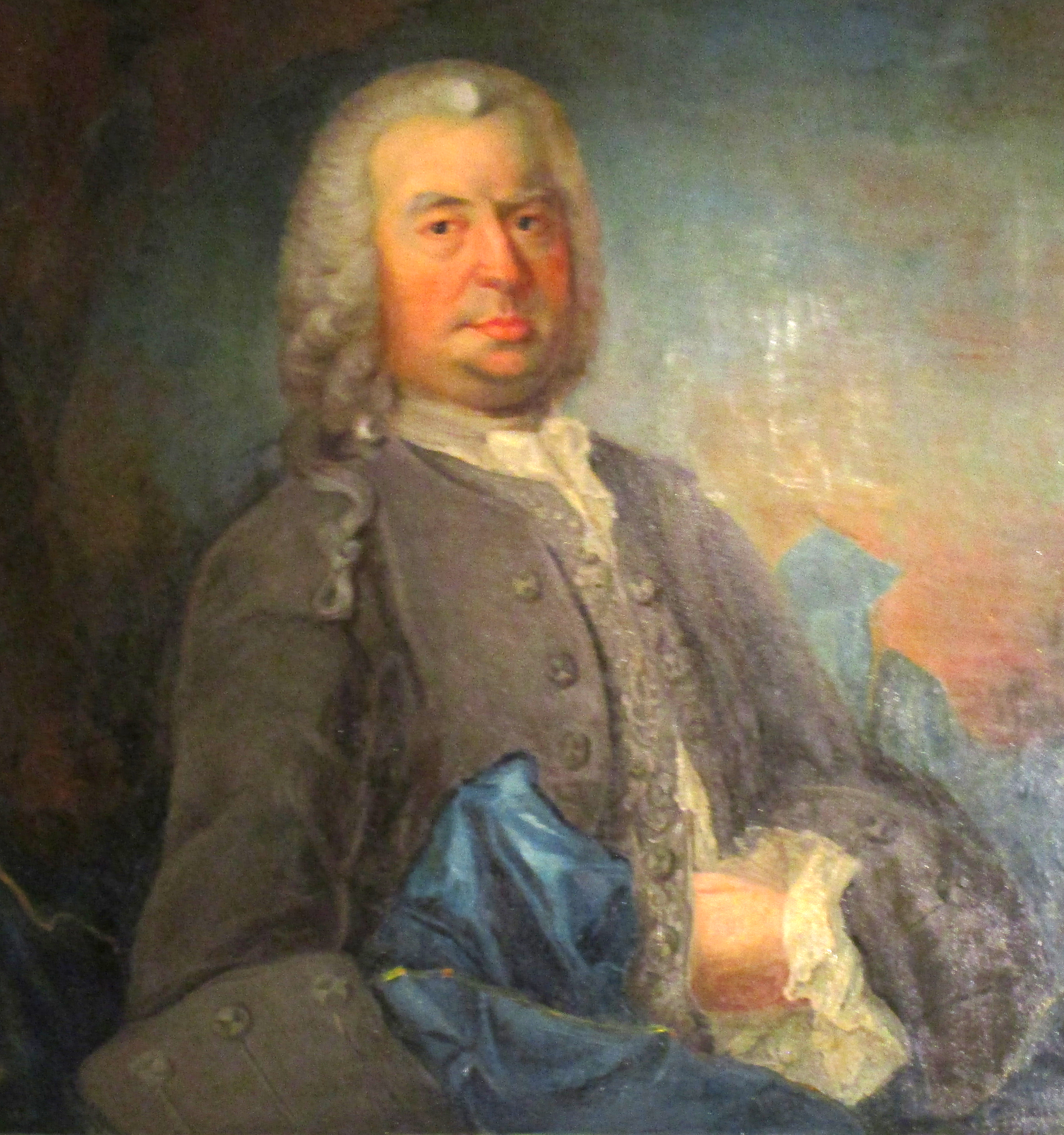
Niclas Sahlgren (1701–1776), co-founder and director of the SOIC

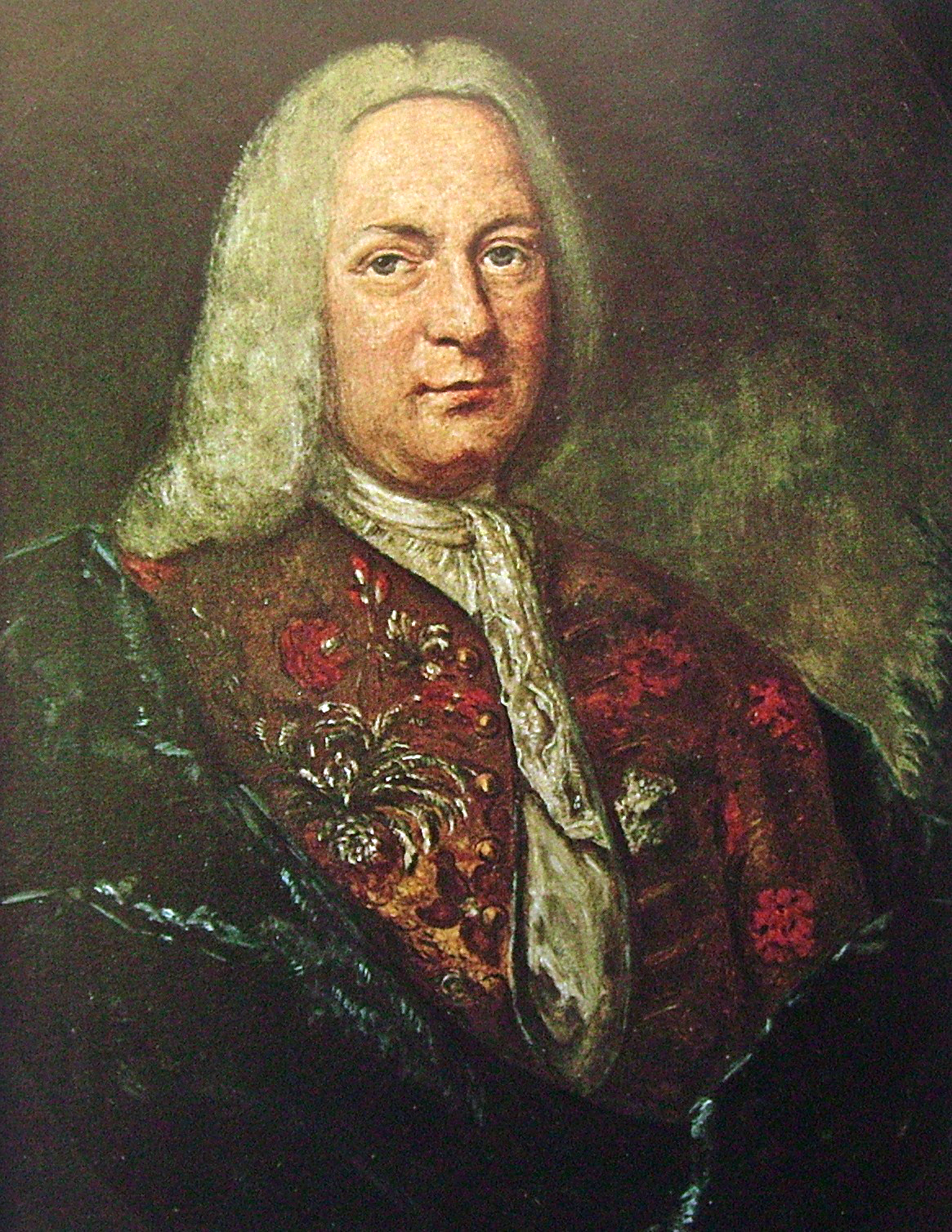
Henrik König (1686–1736), co-founder and director of the SOIC

With the suspension of the charter for the Ostend company by the Emperor Charles VI in May 1727, the investors in that company had to look for other ways to be part of the profitable East India trade and they now looked to Sweden.

Scottish merchant Colin Campbell, formerly active in the Ostend Company, met with Swedish Niclas Sahlgren during Sahlgren's stay in Amsterdam in the late 1720s. Together they made plans for a Swedish trading company, but it was evident that Campbell was the driving force in the enterprise. Since foreign investors were met with suspicion in Sweden, they needed a respectable Swede to front the company. That person would be commissioner Henrik König, a Swede of German (Bremen) origin.

In 1729, Henrik König submitted an application for a charter for two ships. He supported his request on the charter given previously to other applicants, but the reaction from the Swedish government was reluctant: the closing of the Ostend Company in 1731, following British diplomatic pressure as part of the Treaty of Vienna, boded ill for the Swedes' competition against the main powers when trade and politics were so intimately associated. König took the matters to the Swedish parliament and succeeded, gaining royal privileges for the company on 14 June 1731, initially for a period of 15 years. (Note: The reappearance of some Antwerp bankers who had been members of the Ostend Company, as investors in the Swedish East India Company misled some historians in viewing the SOIC as a type of front for continuing the Ostend Company; this misperception was put to rest by Koninckx.) These privileges were the First Charter, or the First Octroi.

=== Royal charter ===
The charter was given to Henrik König & Compagnie and consisted of eighteen precise paragraphs on how the trade should be conducted:

1. The company would have the right to all trade and shipping east of the Cape of Good Hope as far as Japan excepting the port factories of other European nations, unless free consent had been obtained in advance.
2. All departures and arrivals should be out of Gothenburg, and cargo was to be auctioned promptly in Gothenburg on arrival.
3. The Swedish state was to receive 100 riksdaler per läst (c. 2.5 tonnes) (Note: A "läst" was a unit to describe a ships tonnage. In 1723, this was calculated by using the formula: 5/6 of the (ships) length × width × height. This computation later proved unsatisfactory and was replaced by measuring the ship from certain points, multiply these as before and divide by 112. A "läst" could also be described as about 2.5 metric tons (5,500 lb). In 1726, a "ships läst" was defined as 2,448 kilograms (5,397 lb) and in 1863, the "new läst" was introduced and defined as 4,250 kilograms (9,370 lb).) and two riksdaler per läst to the city of Gothenburg, on each shipment, plus taxes. (Note: 1 riksdaler in 1730, is approx. US$ 49.6 based on the consumer price index.)
4. The company could use as many vessels it wanted, but they were to be built and outfitted in Sweden unless something occurred that made it necessary to buy material from other countries.
5. The ships were to fly the Swedish flag and carry Swedish ships' papers.
6. The company was free to use as much money as needed for the expeditions and were entitled to issue shares to finance the venture.
7. The company was forbidden from bringing Swedish coined silver into or out of the country. They were, however, allowed to trade with any other kind of silver.
8. Once the ships were loaded for departure, and when they returned, they were free to enter any port in Sweden.
9. All the equipment, armament goods, and stores needed for the company were exempted from Swedish customs.
10. Goods from the ships were considered prioritized, and could be transported or stored toll-free on any road or in any town.
11. The company's officers would have the same authority as Swedish naval officers.
12. The crew were exempted from service in the Swedish military.
13. The company's officers had the right to arrest and detain anyone in the crew who tried to desert or run away.
14. When the cargo from the ships had been sold, the buyers should not have to pay any extra fees for the goods.
15. The board of the company should always consist of at least three directors.
16. The company was free to employ as many men as needed for the ships. They could be Swedes or foreigners, as long as they were the most skilled.
17. The company had the right to defend itself, to "oppose force with force".
18. The company was enjoined to maintain secrecy on its finances and shareholders.

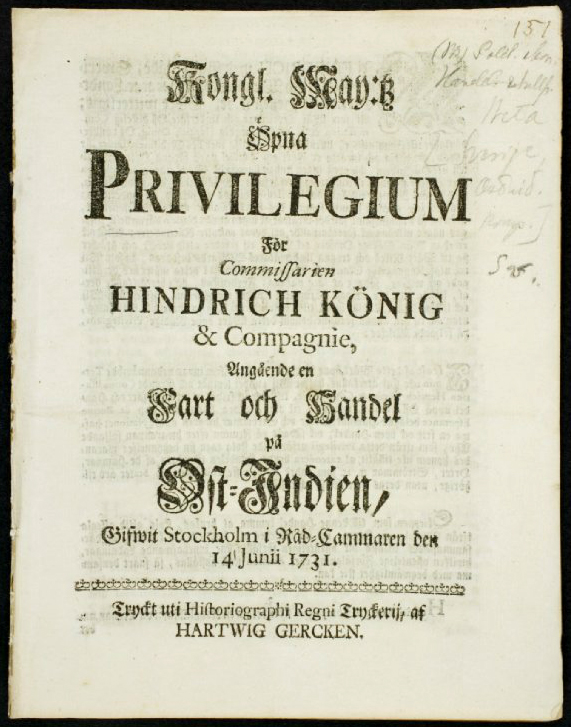
The royal privileges for the SOIC, 14 June 1731

The issuing of shares was such that early subscribers subscribed for each voyage and had the option of withdrawing their capital after its completion, in a traditional form of corporate trading partnerships; in 1753, this having been found inconvenient, it was determined that capital should be considered invested in the company as a whole, on the model of other East India companies. A partner desiring to withdraw his funds was responsible for finding another willing to substitute capital of his own.

The reasons for secrecy on finances and shareholders were both internal and external: British subjects were forbidden to engage in trade in Asia on behalf of the Swedish East India Company and within Sweden suspicions ran high against foreigners, as they were thought to threaten the Swedish profits in the region. Jealousy from merchants not in the company also played a part. Thus, the books were burned after they had been closed and revised, effectively concealing the company's dealings from contemporaries and historians. (Note: Scattered archives have been assembled into a digital archive of the Swedish East India Company, 1731–1813: a joint project of the Gothenburg University Library and the history department of University of Gothenburg: Svenska Ostindiska Companiets Arkiv.)

The letter of privilege was translated into French and Latin and distributed to the major powers. Their reaction was reluctant and they made clear that they considered the new company a most unwelcome competitor. The Swedish ambassador to Britain did not dare to present the letter to the British government. Pledges of assistance at their bases if needed were not answered. France and the Netherlands declared that they saw Sweden as a competitor and they would not contribute to or assist in such a venture.

== Trade ==
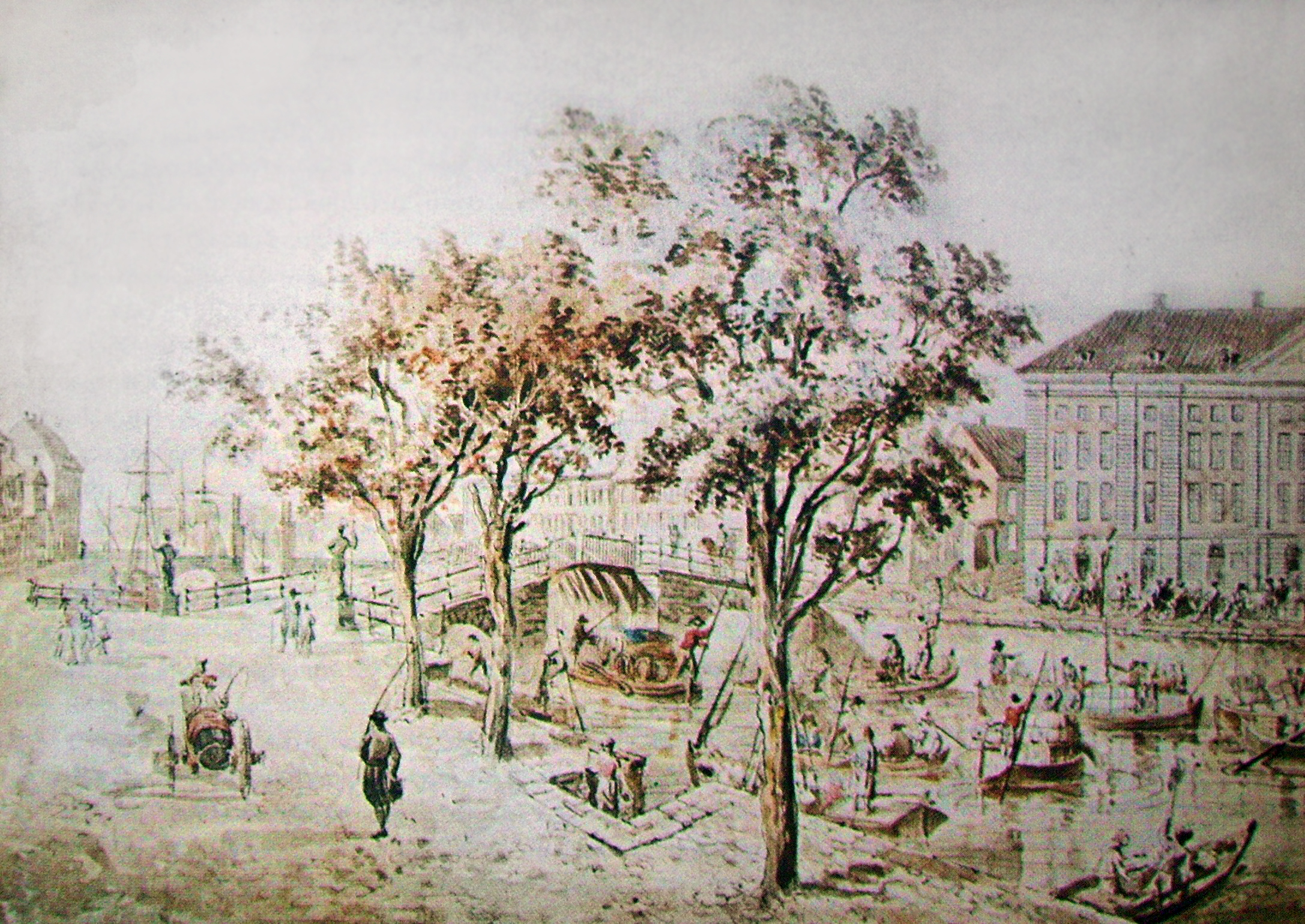
Gothenburg in 1787 with the SOIC building to the right, Elias Martin

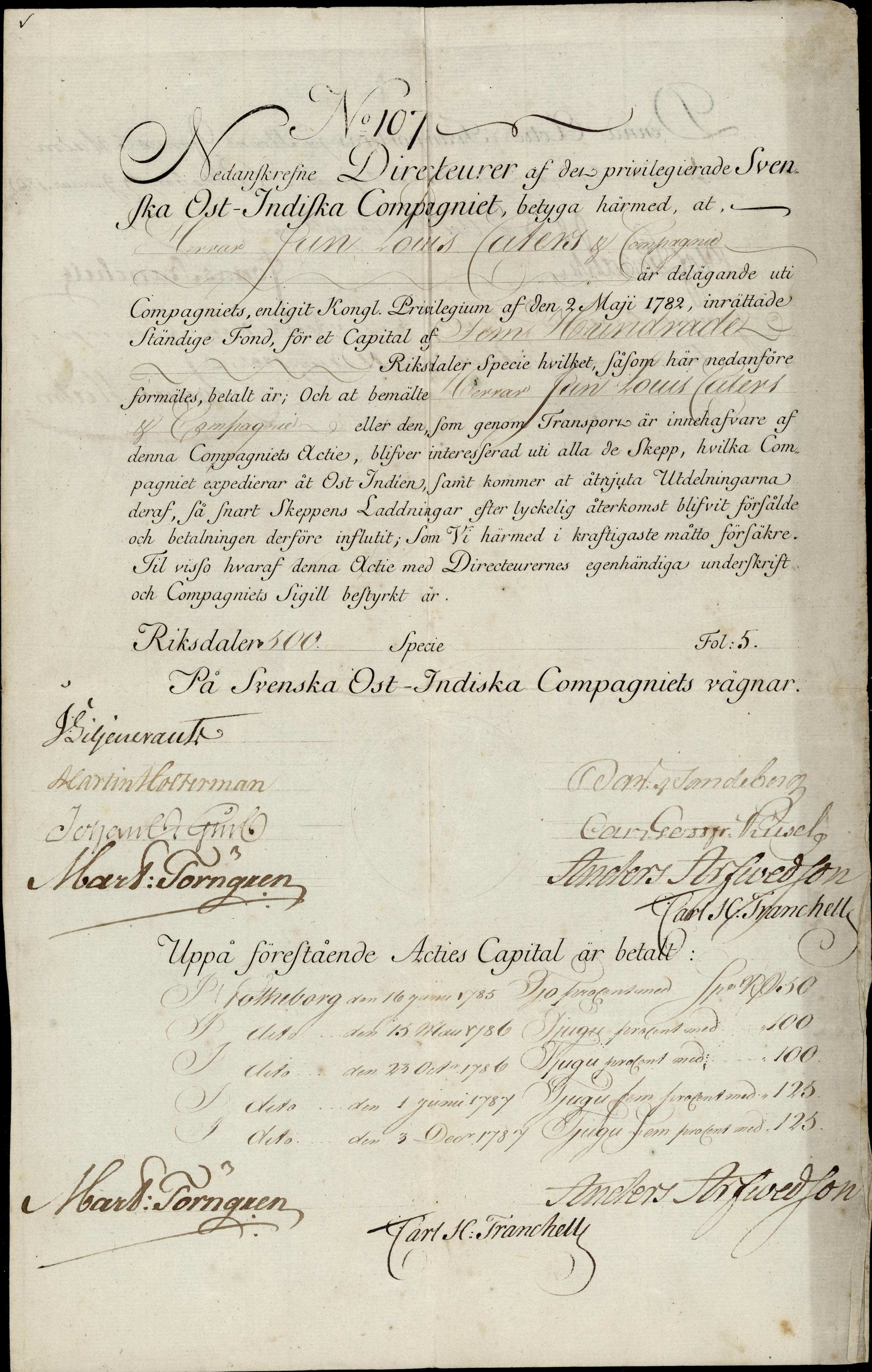
Share of the Svenska Ost-Indiska Compagniet, issued 2. May 1782

After having been ruled by a number of autocratic and ambitious kings, Sweden was, at the forming of the SOIC, practically run without the participation of the king. The real political power lay with the Riksdag of the Estates where the first two political parties, the Hats and the Caps, competed for power. The king did not even have to attend the meetings of the Riksdag; he had been substituted with his name stamp. The king, or prince consort, at that time was Frederick I, considered the most incompetent king of Sweden by many contemporary politicians and later historians. His only interests were hunting and women; the king's absence gave the Riksdag and the bureaucrats a free rein to promote trade and science.

During its entire existence from 1731 to 1813, the SOIC made 131 voyages, (Note: The number varies. In the secondary source Kjellberg, the number of voyages in the text about the four octrois are 25, 36, 39, 31 total 131, and in the lists of ships the numbers are 25, 35, 39, 32 total 131. In tertiary sources, such as Frängsmyr and website of the Nordic Museum the total number of voyages is stated as 132. In all the sources the term "expedition" is used both for actual expeditions and for the voyage made by one ship. The first five expeditions contained only one ship, but starting from the sixth expedition, two ships and later three or four, were included in each expedition. The term "expedition" is mainly used during the first octroi, later on only "voyages" were used, one ship equaling one voyage.) using 37 different ships. Of these, eight ships were lost, totally or partially. The sorest loss was probably the Götheborg in 1745, as it sank just off Älvsborg fortress at the entrance to Gothenburg having managed to journey safely to China and back. Even though most books were burned, it is evident that the voyages were extremely profitable for the shareholders, and many Swedes became wealthy due to the SOIC.

From Gothenburg the vessels carried iron, both in bars and processed, as axes, anchors, steel, etc. Copper was also brought, as was timber. The expeditions called at Cádiz where they traded goods to acquire essential Spanish silver, on which the China trade depended in the form of coins, pesos duros, since the charter stated that the silver carried to China, coined or uncoined, could not be Swedish. The company also had to pay tax to the Dey of Algiers and carry Moroccan passports, thereby being ensured protection from raids by Barbary pirates. These transactions are documented in receipts.

The return on expeditions could be around 25–30% of the capital invested, but up to 60% was achieved. Much depended on the merchants and the captain; the merchants had to close numerous favourable deals, and the captain had the difficult task of safely sailing the ship to China and back. The vessels were around 50 metres (160 ft) long, and in addition to cargo and men, each ship also carried about 25–30 cannons for self-defence and signaling. In most years of the period after 1766 one or two SOIC ships were loaded at Canton, or as many a four (1785–86). The last vessel returned to Gothenburg in March 1806, and even though the company had charters until 1821, it ceased to exist in 1813.

Life onboard the ships was hard and hazardous, the crew was malnourished and not used to the heat and humidity in the ports they visited during the journey. In addition to this, the doctors on board were completely helpless when it came to dealing with fevers and tropical illnesses. It is estimated that about 2,000 men died in the service of the company.

=== First octroi (1731–1746) ===
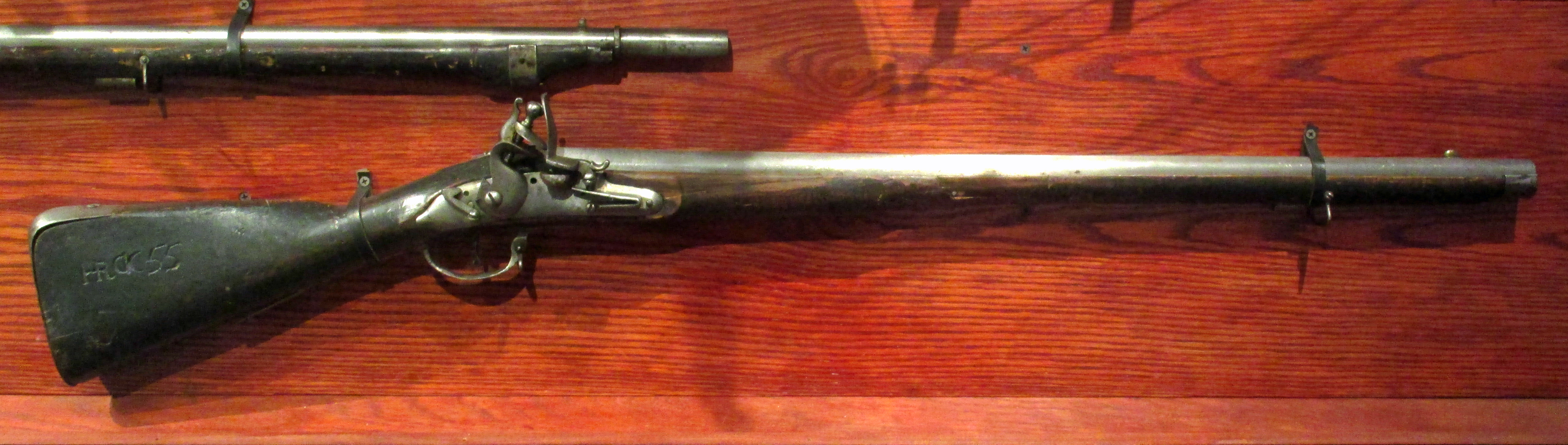
Rifle made in 1725, used onboard a Swedish East Indiaman

The first three directors of the SOIC was Henrik König, Colin Campbell and Frans Bedoire. König was a merchant from Stockholm. Bedoir was the son of a French wigmaker who had relocated to Sweden to import French wine. Campbell was the driving force for the whole enterprise since he had gained firsthand knowledge of the China trade as supercargo for the Ostend Company. He was knighted by King Frederick I and moved to Gothenburg to organize the first expedition.

The first two expeditions proved dangerous and complicated since the rest of the trading nations did not take kindly to Sweden's attempt to engage in the trade. The first ship was seized by the Dutch and the second was destroyed by the British and the French. This fueled the opposition against the trade in Sweden and the SOIC started a massive PR-campaign about the benefits of trading with the East Indies. They also agreed to make certain concessions about what goods to import from China. To avoid confrontations with the other trading countries, the company refrained from seeking trade with India and focused on China instead.

A total of 15 expeditions supported by 25 ships were launched during the first charter. Four of the ships were lost at sea. Only three of these expeditions went to Bengal; the rest sailed directly to Canton.

Books and accounts from the first expeditions are missing, partially or completely, but starting with the eighth expedition (the ships Fredericus Rex Sueciae, Stockholm and Riddarhuset in 1740) until the closing of the last in 1748, records were so complete that an estimate of the profits could be made for these. The total sum of the income from the imported goods was 24.649 million riksdaler (approx. US$1,222.6 million), making the dividend about 39% in average. During those years the share of the profit for the five directors totaled 550,000 riksdaler (approx. US$27.28 million) and the total sum that went to the 53 supercargoes (Note: Abercromby, Arthur; Barrington, Charles; Barry, Gerard; Beyer, Gabriel; Bock, Adr. de; Bratt, Charles; Campbell, Dougald; Campbell, Colin; Campell, Walter; Coppinger, James Adam; Croisier, Jean Baptiste; Cummings, Dornier; Elliott, William; Flanderine, Andreas J.; Fothringham; Gadd, Anders; Giers, Pastan; Gotheen, Andreas; Graham, Charles; Greiff, Jacob; Heegg, Nicolas; Hofwart; Irvine, Charles; Kampe, Peter von; Kitchin, George; Kniper, Stephen; Kåhre, Carl; König, Fredrik Wilhelm; König, Henrik; König, Peter Teodor; Loriol, Johan; Matsen, John Henry; Metcalfe, John; Moir, James; Morford, Charles; Olbers, Andreas; Pike, John; Ross, Alexander; Ross, Gustaf; Ström, Niklas; Ström, Olof; Tabuteau, Auguste; Tham, Sebastian; Tham, Volrath; Thomson, Thomas; Turoloen, H; Uhrlander. Hans Philip; Utfall, Jacob von; Verbecke, Michill; Widdrington, John; Vignaulx, Daniel; Williams, John; Young, John.) was about 800,000 riksdaler (approx. US$39.67 million).

The unwillingness of the established trading nations, primarily Britain, the Dutch Republic and France, to help and acknowledge the SOIC during the first years were founded on the suspicion that the company was merely a front for those merchants who wished to circumvent the rules and regulations of the East India trade in their own countries. These suspicions were well founded. All of the initiators of the SOIC were non-Swedes or of foreign descent. Swedish law made it possible for anyone who invested in the company to receive Swedish citizenship and most of the crew aboard the ships during the first and the second octroi were foreigners. Of the 53 supercargoes during the first octroi, (Note: The list on pages 177–78 in Kjellberg has 53 names of supercargoes in the first octroi, but in the summary it is stated that "... there were 40 foreign against 11 Swedish supercargoes." during the first octroi.) about 22 percent were Swedes.

==== First expedition ====
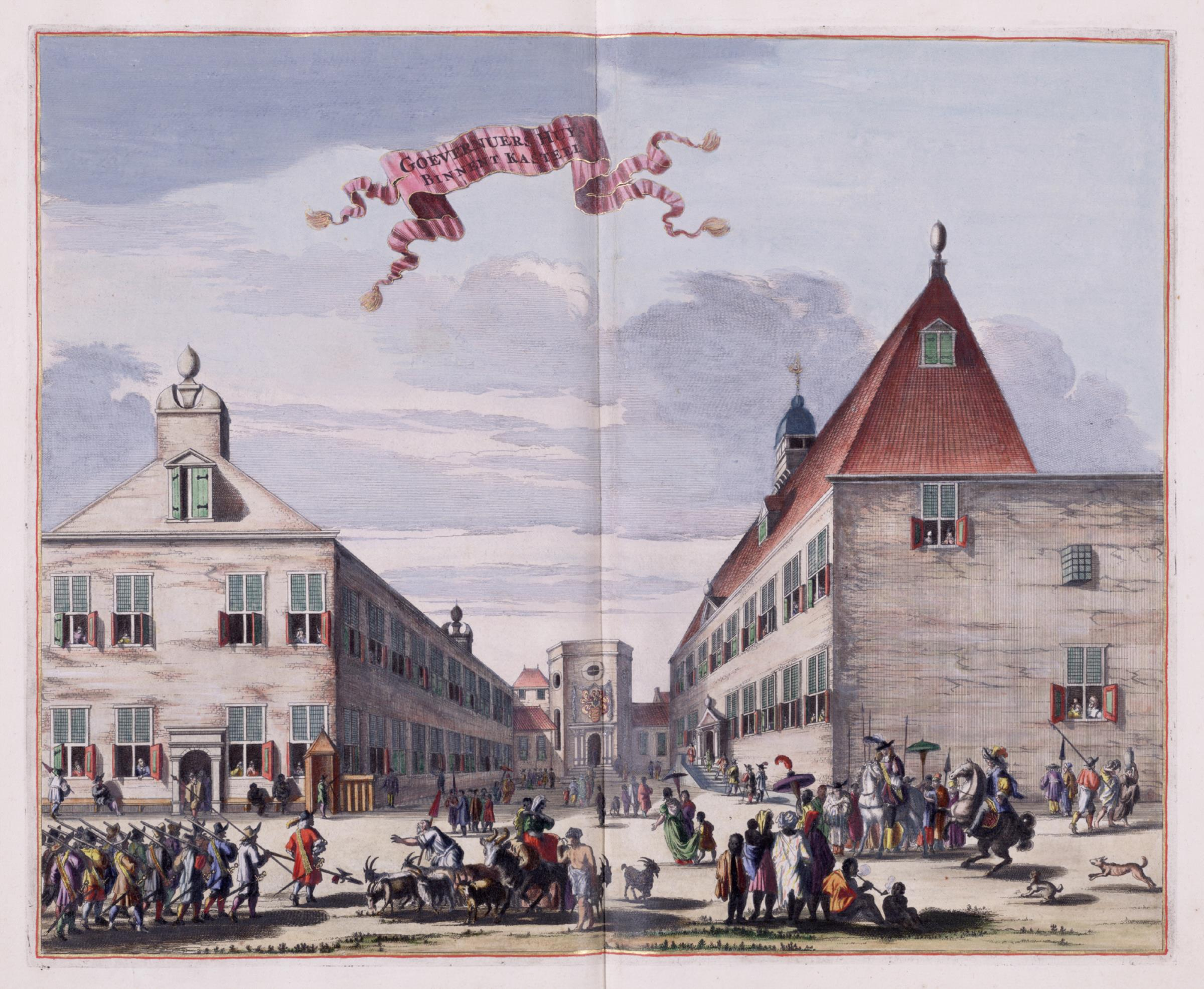
Residence of the governor general and the VOC buildings in Batavia. At the centre is a chapel.

The first expedition was organized by Campbell. His reconstructed diary of the voyage, rediscovered in 1986, contains a complete account of the expedition. (Note: Campbell had destroyed his diary when the ship was taken by the Dutch and reconstructed it from memory and some loose papers; it was translated and published by Paul Hallberg and Christian Koninckx.) It started on 9 February 1732, as the ship Friedericus Rex Sueciae sailed out from Gothenburg. Campbell was the first supercargo onboard and had also been appointed ambassador to the Chinese court by the King. The other three supercargos were English: Charles Graham, Charles Morford and John Pike. The captain of the Fredericus was Georg Herman af Trolle, a seasoned sailor who had been brought up in Amsterdam and previously served on British, French, Dutch and Danish ships. He had also been employed as a privateer by the town of Middelburg. Both he and Campbell had previously visited China. The crew for the ship was approximately one hundred men.

The expedition started well – passing the Cape of Good Hope and crossing the Indian Ocean, the vessel arrived safely in Canton (now known as Guangzhou), the trading port for foreigners in China at that time, in September 1732. For the next four months, trading was carried out successfully. Initially, different spices were the primary commodity along with tea, silk and miscellaneous luxury items, but on later voyages, porcelain and tea made up the bulk of the trade to meet the demand for such goods back in Europe.

On its return, the vessel was stopped by the Dutch between Java and Sumatra, and brought to Batavia. Campbell protested and produced his papers, but the Dutch argued that they had suspected the vessel of falsely flying the Swedish flag. The expedition was eventually released, (Note: "Since which period the Swedish East India Company have been suffered to carry on their trade without the least interruption, but which is solely confined to China," Milburn in summary of the Swedish East India Company.) but time was lost and the winds unfavourable. Many of the seamen died en route and the ship had to recruit new Norwegian sailors upon reaching the coast of Norway.

Almost one and a half years after the departure, the vessel returned to Gothenburg on 27 August 1733. The expedition was a huge economic success, the auction bringing in some 900,000 Swedish riksdaler. The dividend paid was 75% of the capital invested. According to the ledgers of the Gothenburg Main Customs Cambers for Sea Trade in 1733 to 1734, goods for 518,972 riksdaler were exported; the rest stayed in Sweden.

=== Second octroi (1746–1766) ===
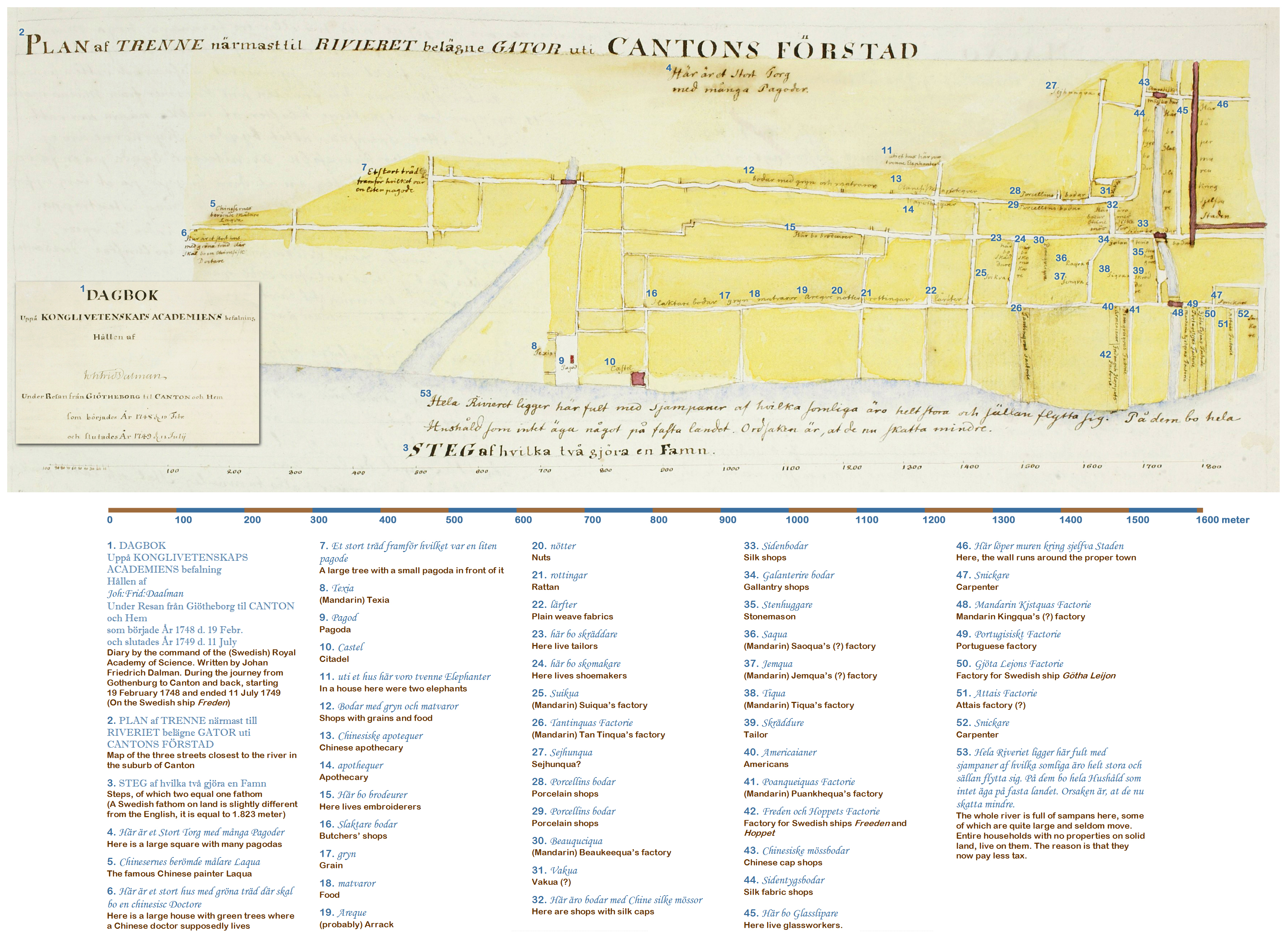
The riverside part of Canton by Johan Fredrik Dalman, 1748–49

The charter was renewed in 1746, 1766 and 1786, creating the Second, Third and Fourth Octrois.

Under the terms of the second charter 36 ships were sent out, three to Surat, the rest to Canton, and only one was lost.

The profit for the shareholders during the first charter generated large interest for a second charter. Except for the foreign investors, most of the merchants during the first charter had been from Gothenburg. With the second charter, a number of merchants from Stockholm started to show interest in the trade. On 23 September 1745, a request for a second octroi was presented by the firm Abraham and Jacob Arfwedsson & Co. They received a preliminary grant for it. A couple of weeks later, a second request for an octroi was made by the company Anders Plomgren & C:o and partner Carl Broman. The directors from the first charter submitted their request on 20 January 1746.

A commission to investigate the applications was appointed on 24 March 1746, and some weeks later on 14 May, they concluded that the directors from the first charter were best suited to lead the second as well. However, the number of directors was increased from three to at least seven. In addition to Colin Campbell, Niclas Sahlgren and Teodor Ankarcrona, the directors were former secretary of the Executive Board Magnus Lagerström, the Stockholm merchants Anders Plomgren and Abraham Grill. These six members of the board later elected Claes Grill, Jacob von Utfall Jeanson, S. N. Wenngren and Nils Ström as directors.

The second charter was for 20 years and the directors followed the ways of the first octroi. They collected the means from the investors to fund each of the first 14 ships separately. In 1753, the company was reorganized into a joint-stock company by creating a fixed fund where anyone could subscribe for shares, but not for less than 500 riksdaler in silver.

Even after the company went public, it still retained its secrecy regarding the business. The management deliberately withheld information from the shareholders or lied about how profitable parts of the business were. The directors said that the profit from the trade with China was declining and that the company should be granted permission to send a ship to India, contrary to the regulations for the trade so far. An exemption was granted in 1749, and a ship was sent to Surat in India. On its return in 1752, that ship yielded a profit of 103% and two more ships were sent to Surat. The British and Dutch controlled most of the trade in the town and did everything to prevent the Swedes from doing business there and several incidents occurred. The company decided to refocus in the China trade instead. That trade yielded an average profit of 30–40% during the second charter.

=== Third octroi (1766–1786) ===
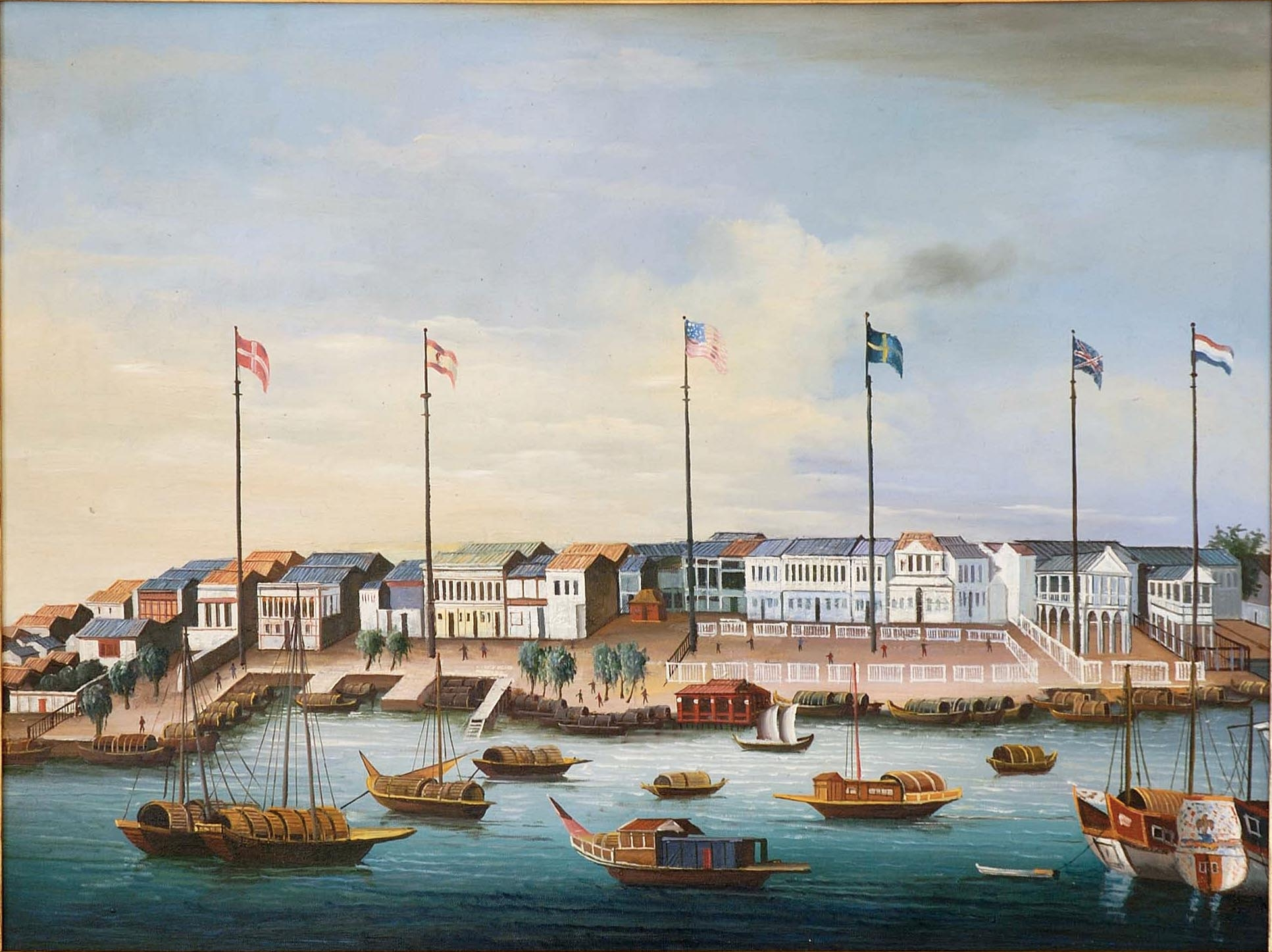
Canton Thirteen Factories, with flags of Denmark, Spain, the U.S., Sweden, Britain, and the Netherlands, c. 1820

When it was time to renew the charter in 1766, the first directors were Robert Finlay of Irish and Scottish origin, Swedish Fabian Löwen and Georg Herman Conradi of German descent, all residing in Stockholm. With this the power within the management shifted from Gothenburg to Stockholm, where two new ships also were bought. The Swedish government extorted a loan at 6% interest to the SOIC to be paid during 1766–69, estimated in 1813 to have been the equivalent of £100,000, and another, interest-free, for half of that sum, to be repaid out of import duties, in essence an advance payment of duty.

During the third charter, 39 voyages were made to Canton and none of the ships was lost or damaged, but the profit from the trade with China was declining. The turning point for Sweden came in 1780 during the American Revolutionary War, when France, the Dutch Republic and Spain declared war on Britain and were subsequently unable to trade with China. The price of tea fell in Canton due to the lack of demand, but went up in Europe where Sweden was now practically the only supplier of tea. This was reflected in the total sum of the profit for the third octroi, which was 58% higher than the previous two.

The goods that were exported from Sweden also changed during that period. The former main products such as iron, wood and tar are missing from the freight lists. Instead the biggest item was silver, followed by English lead and Swedish woollen cloth or broadcloth. During the later part of the third charter, it became common practice for one of the supercargoes to stay on permanently in Canton for years. One of those was Jean Abraham Grill, who made ample use of his time there for his own private affairs, a practice that was continued by other resident supercargoes. Carl Linnaeus and the Royal Swedish Academy of Sciences also made use of the company's ships. They sent out scientists and researchers to gather information about animals and plants from all the places that the ships visited and to keep detailed journals. The company would not allow idle passengers on board, so most of the scientists were given "crash courses" in theology and were hastily ordained to serve as ship's chaplains. These arrangements started during the second charter and peaked during the third.

In 1758, the Swedes were finally able to let their ships anchor and replenish provisions at the Cape (now known as Cape Town), a port controlled by the Dutch, due to political changes in Europe. But with the end of the American war in 1783, Sweden lost its advantage in the tea trade and the decline of the company resumed. The SOIC's supercargo in Canton in 1777, Peter Johan Bladh, reflected on this and suggested that an emissary should be sent to the emperor of China with a proposition that the European trade with China should be conducted through one single European company, administered by Sweden. Bladh argued that unless efforts were taken to oppose them the British would dominate European trade with China the same way they had done in India by "securing an unbearable domination" there. The request was never sent since the directors wanted to continue the trade in the same way as before.

The mercantile expansion of the SOIC during the third octroi provided a setting for Jacob Wallenberg's comic Min son på galejan ("My Son on [sic] the Galley") written during the 18-month round trip to Canton in 1769–71. (Note: Rose examines the comic account of a real voyage.) Among his other joking and casual racism, Wallenberg parodies the serious accounts published by traveling naturalists in the wide web of Carl Linnaeus' correspondence. (Note: "Spoofing Linnaeus".)

=== Fourth octroi (1786–1806) ===
The SOIC continued into the fourth charter, much the same company that had existed during the last part of the third. The management was the same, a fixed fund existed and some of the fees, taxes and regulations were altered. During this octroi, the company owned 12 ships that were sent out on a total of 31 journeys. Three of the ships were lost and one was damaged and sold. The shareholders received no dividend during the fourth octroi.

The profit from the trade continued to decline, much because of the new rules and regulations regarding the import of tea to England. Most of the SOIC's earlier tea cargoes had been smuggled to England, but the profit no longer made up for the risk of such an undertaking. Talk of shutting down the company started in 1789, and after 1804, no more ships were sent out from Sweden. On 27 June 1808, the company informed the shareholders of the situation and on 18 May 1811, the company of the fourth charter was declared bankrupt.

=== Decline and fall ===
There was a fifth octroi, starting in 1806 with privileges granted for 15 years, but those were quite different from the previous. Now anyone had the right to trade with the countries on the other side of Cape if the SOIC had not started the trade by launching a ship within two years. With the investors' faith in the trade now broken, no ships were sent out and at a shareholders meeting on 13 December 1813, the company folded, eight years before the octroi ended. The remaining stock and inventory was sold to foreign buyers and in 1814, the trade was declared free for anyone.

== Cargo ==
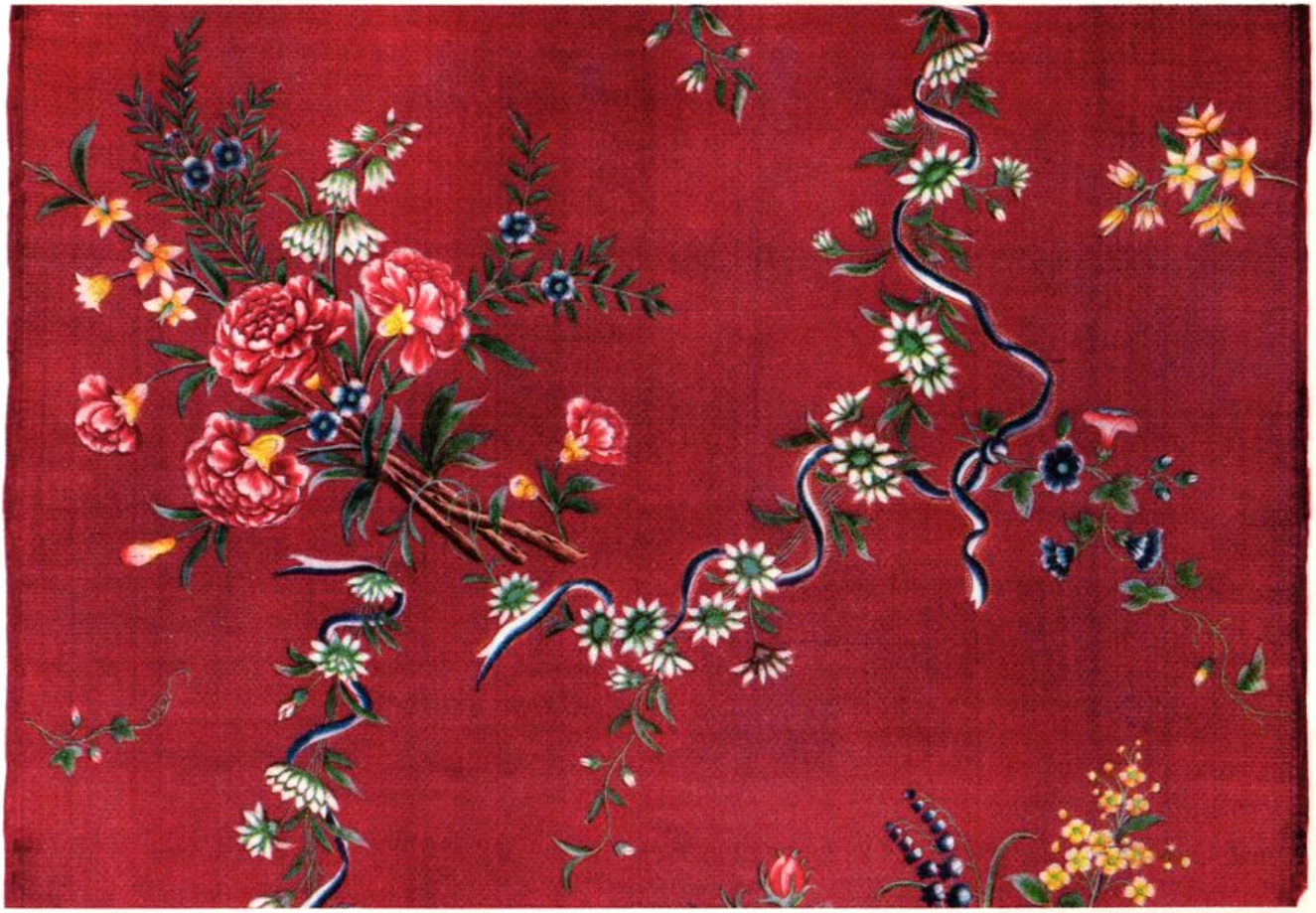
Painted Chinese silk fabric brought to Sweden by the SOIC, 18th century

The main valuable cargo from China was tea. In an overview from 1774, its share was about 90%. Much of the tea was re-exported and smuggled into England, undercutting the prices of that country's own trade monopoly held by the East India Company. Porcelain was also important, accounting for about 5% of the cargo's value. Over the years it is estimated that some 50 million pieces of porcelain were imported by the SOIC. The spirit arrack, a new commodity for Sweden, was also considered valuable.

A cargo tally, printed by William Milburn in 1813, shows the following.

Chests of tea:

- Bohea, 1,030,642 pounds (467,491 kg) in 2885 chests
- Congou (90,589 pounds (41,090 kg))
- Souchong (67,388 pounds (30,567 kg))
- Pekoe (17,205 pounds (7,804 kg))
- Hyson and "Hyson Skin" (Note: Definition of Hyson skin varies: "The light and inferior leaves separated from hyson by a winnowing machine." ...a superior kind of green tea, of a round, knobby, brightish leaf; but great part of what is imported, is of inferior quality, of a yellowish open leaf, somewhat resembling singlo, and, in consequence, varies greatly in price.") (together 5,713 pounds (2,591 kg))

Textiles:

- Damasks and heavier damasks for furniture
- Satin silk, some of it "coloured and flowered"
- Paduasoy
- Grogram also known as gorgoron
- Taffetas,
- Lampas
- Nankeen cloth
- 33 chests of raw silk

Drugs:

- Galangal root
- China root
- Sago
- Rhubarb

Miscellaneous:

- Mother-of-pearl, some of it cut in thin jetons
- Thin canes for hoops
- Painted wallpapers
- Lacquered (japanned) quadrille boxes
- Dressing tables
- Tablets for table tops
- Arrack (used in Swedish punsch), 6 metric tons (13,000 lb)
- Porcelain, in 274 chests and 989 barrels and other packages

== Ships ==
The ships used by the Swedish East India Company.

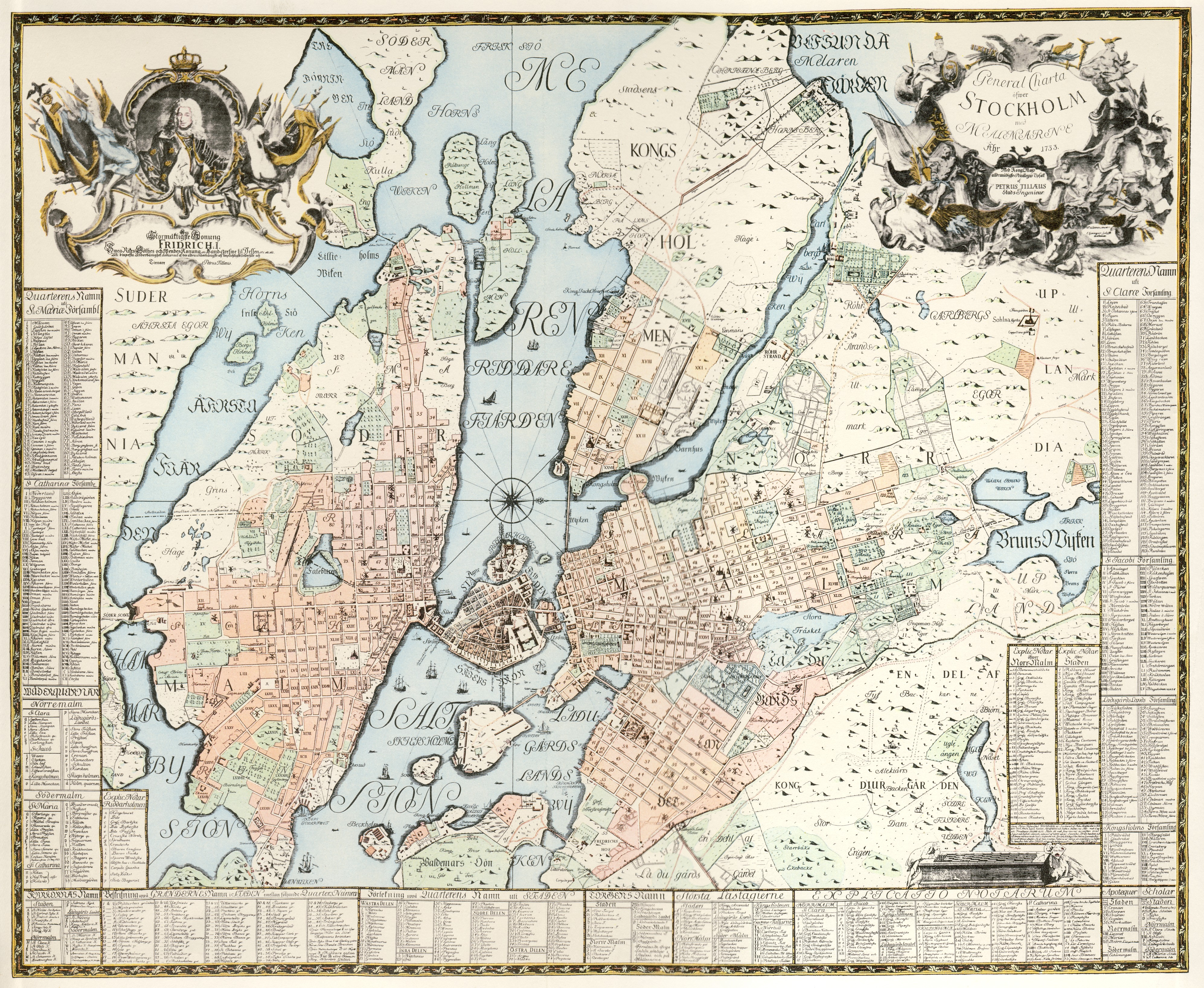
Map of Stockholm in 1733, by Petrus Tillaeus

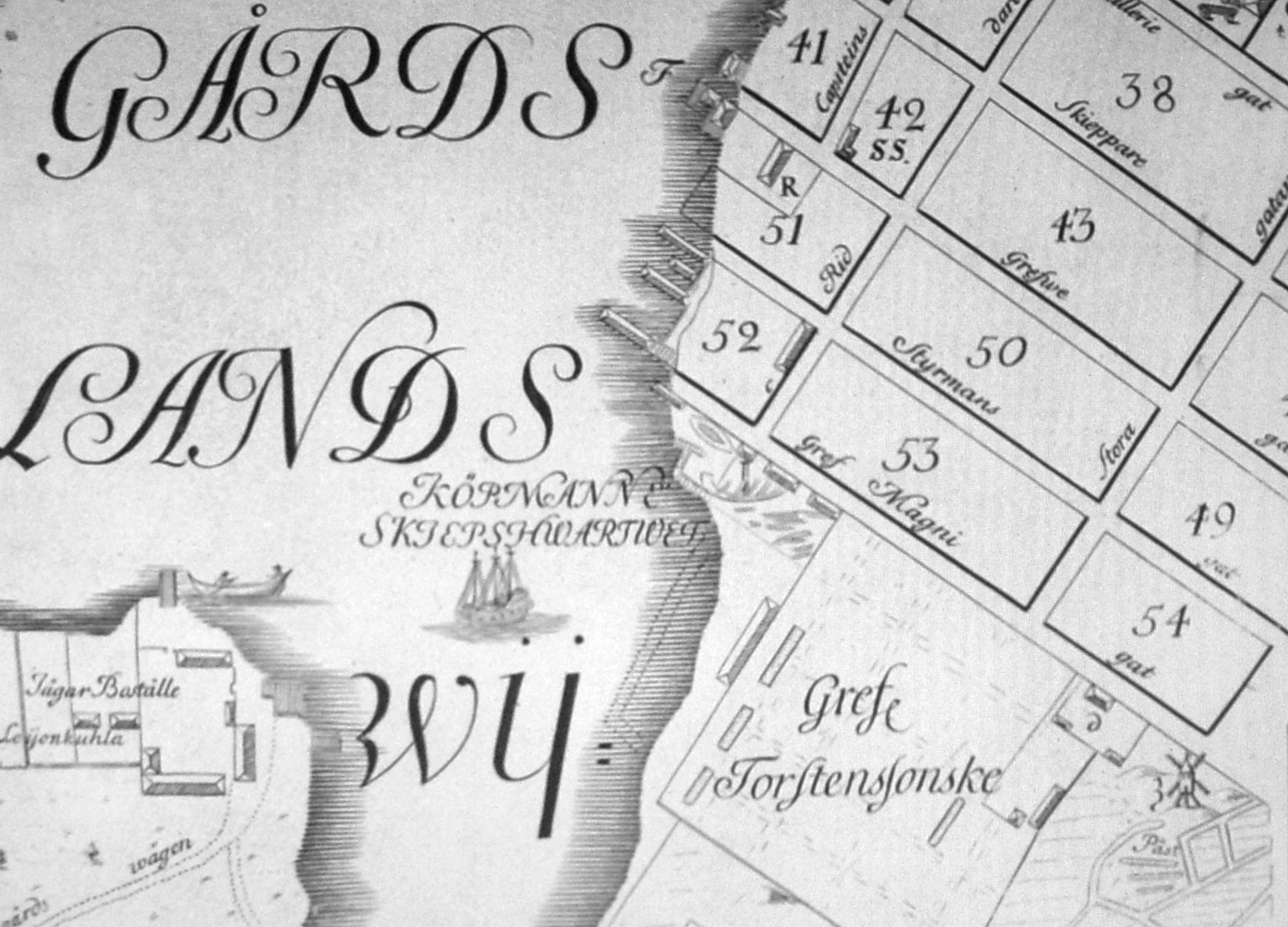
Close-up of Tillaeus' map showing the Terra Nova wharf, 1733

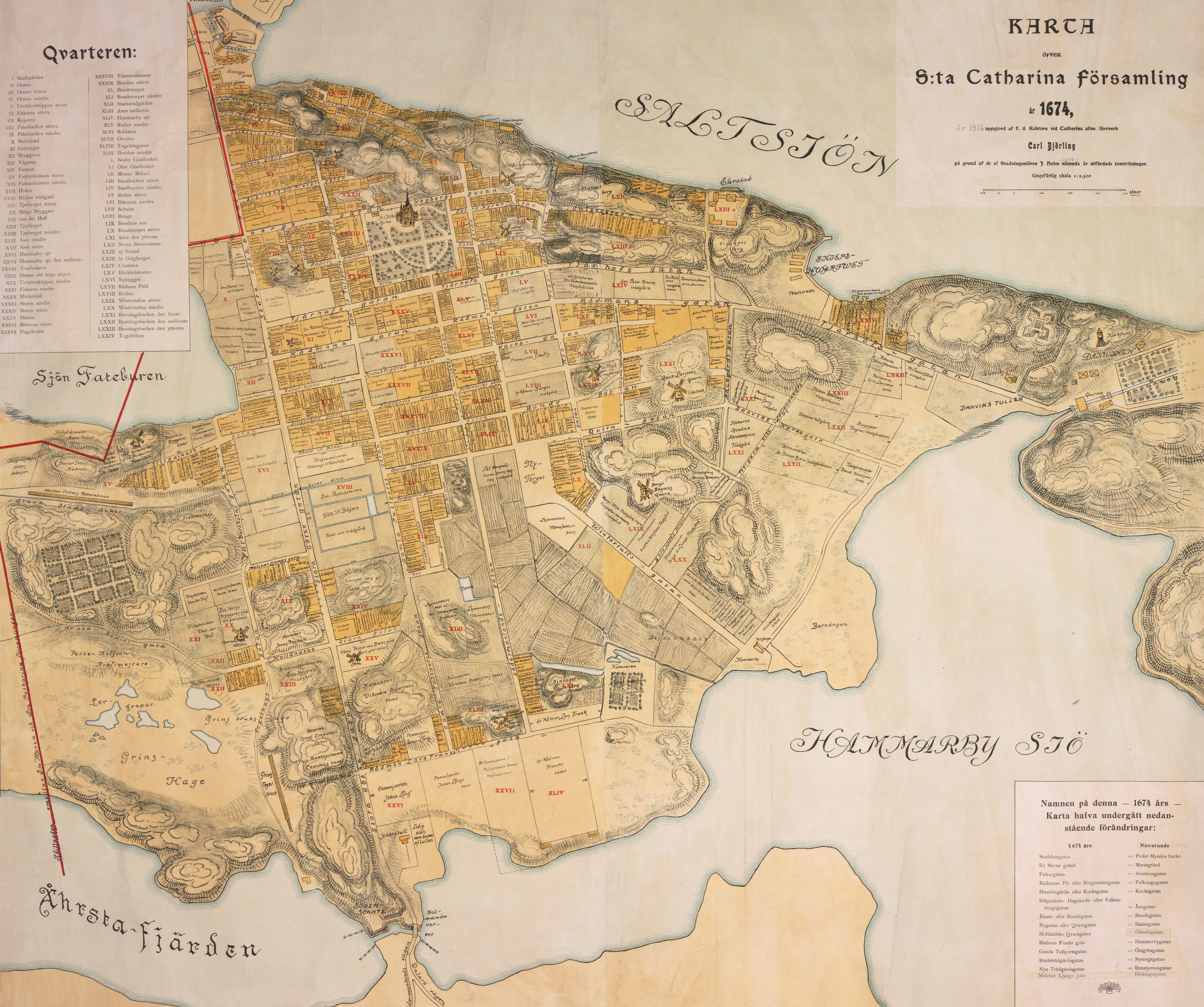
Southeast Stockholm in 1674, with the Stora Stads wharf bay in the upper righthand corner. Reconstructed map. (Note: Reconstruction by Carl Björling, 1916, from the Estate book by Johan Holm written in 1674.)

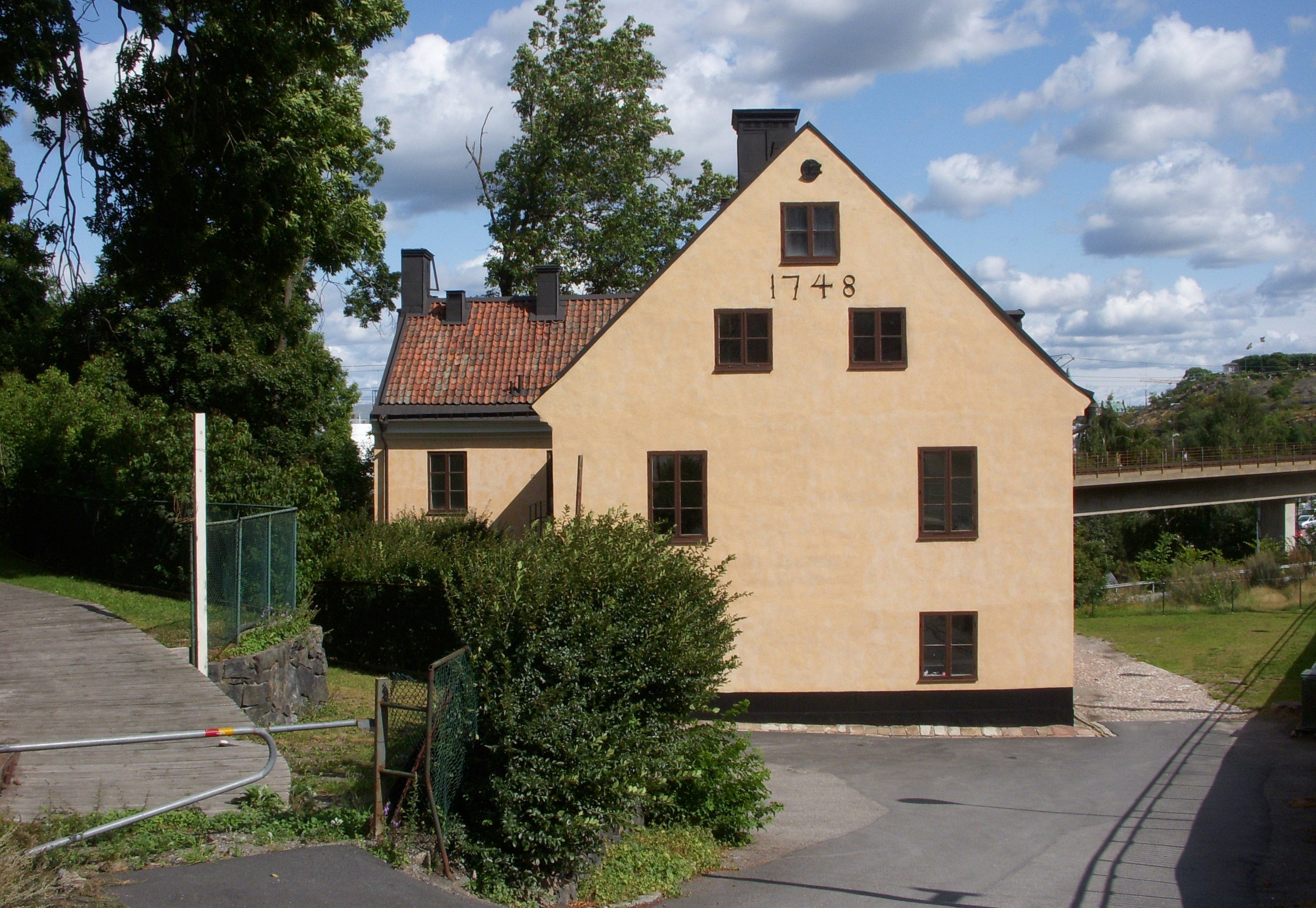
The shipwright's house at the Stora Stads wharf in Stockholm built in 1748

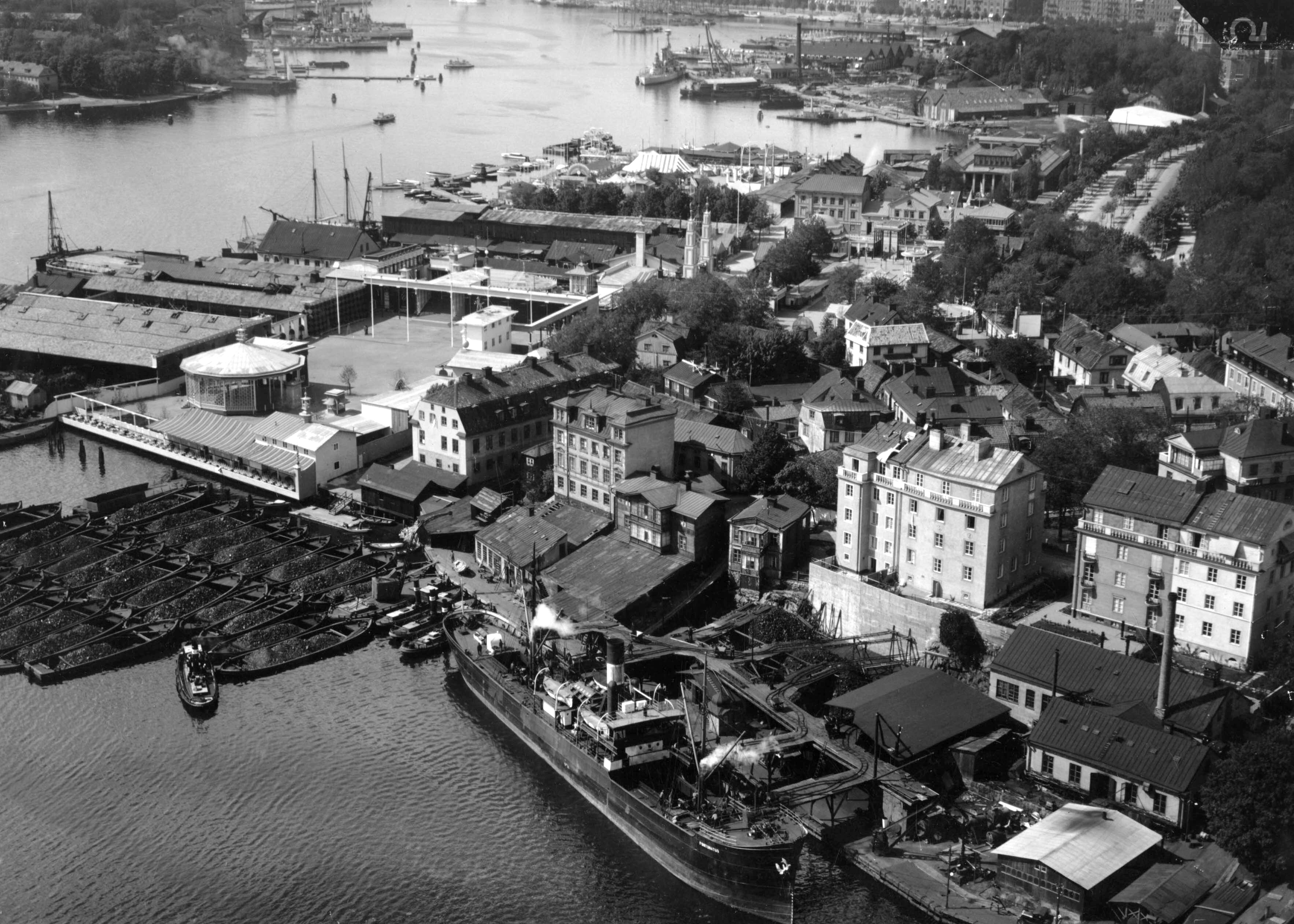
The Djurgården wharf in 1928

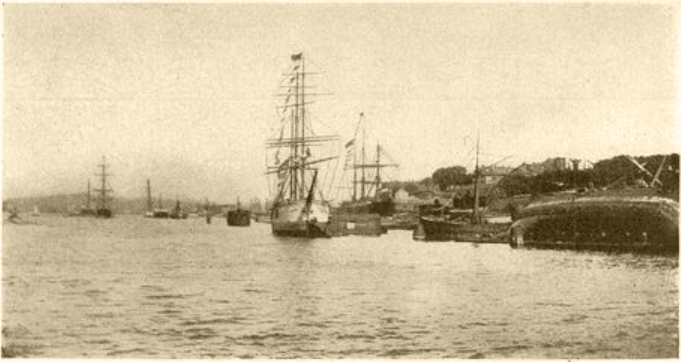
The Old wharf in Gothenburg c. 1919

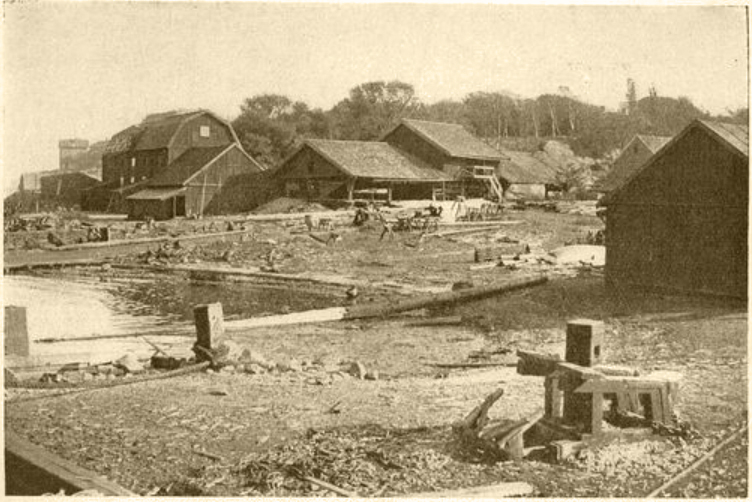
Store houses at the Old wharf Gothenburg c. 1919

Ship	Built at	Lästs	Cannons	Crew	Journeys
The first octroi 14 June 1731 – 14 June 1746
Friedericus Rex Sueciae	The Terra Nova wharf, (Note: The Terra Nova wharf, also known as the Köpmannavarvet (the Merchants Wharf), was founded by Abraham Grill in 1716. It was situated in central Stockholm where the Strandvägen is today. The wharf was sold in 1782, and the land was passed on to the Swedish state in 1819.) Stockholm	200	20	100	5
Drottning Ulrica Eleonora	Former English ship The Heatcot	250	-	103	1
Tre Cronor	Unknown location outside Sweden	255	28	-	1
Suecia	The Terra Nova wharf, Stockholm	283	28	120	2
Götheborg (I)	The Terra Nova wharf, Stockholm	340	30	120	3 Lost at Gothenburg; 12 September 1745
Stockholm	The Clasons wharf, (Note: The wharf ("Clasons varv") was founded by Johan Clason in 1725, and later inherited by his son. It was situated on the south-east part of the Blasieholmen peninsula in central Stockholm.) Stockholm	260	28	120	3 Lost at Shetland; 12 January 1745
Riddarhuset	The Clasons wharf, Stockholm	340	30	135	2
Calmar	Kalmar	254	22	100	3
Drottningen af Swerige	Stockholm	387	30	130	2 Lost at Shetland; 12 January 1745
Cronprinsessan Lovisa Ulrica	-	320	24	120	1
Freeden	The Terra Nova wharf, Stockholm	260	22	120	1
Cronprinsen Adolph Friedric	The Stora Stads wharf, (Note: The wharf ("Stora Stadsvarvet") was founded in 1687, and operated by the city of Stockholm until 1694 when it was leased by Anthoni Grill and various members of the Grill Trading House. It was situated in the south part of Stockholm on the west shore of Tegelviken, right opposite the Fåfängan.) Stockholm	387	27	140	1
The second octroi 17 June 1746 – 17 June 1766
Prins Gustaf	The Terra Nova wharf, Stockholm	236	28	110	1
Götha Leijon	-	310	28	120	3
Freeden	The same ship as in the first octroi, passed on to the second octroi.	260	22	130	1
Hoppet	The Terra Nova wharf, Stockholm	280	28	30	2
Cronprinsessan Lovisa Ulrica	The same ship as in the first octroi, passed on to the second octroi.	320	24	120	1
Enigheten	The Djurgården wharf, (Note: The wharf ("Djurgårdsvarvet", later the "Lotsack-Kiermanska Djurgårdsvarvet") was founded by Ephraim Losack in 1735. After the death of Losack, the wharf was passed on to Gustaf Kierman, who married Losack's widow in 1752. After the bankruptcy and death of Kierman, the wharf was taken over by a consortium which operated the wharf to the middle of the 19th century. It is situated at Djurgården in Stockholm, next to where the Gröna Lund is today. As of 2014, the wharf is still in operation, albeit on a smaller scale. In 2009, it was renovated along with the adjacent houses.) Stockholm	375	28	140	4
Cronprinsen Adolph Friederic	The same ship as in the first octroi, passed on to the second octroi.	387	27	140	2
Prins Carl	The Clasons wharf, Stockholm	350	30	140	6
Prins Friederic Adolph	The Terra Nova wharf, Stockholm	398	26	130	4 Lost in the South China Sea; 3 September 1761
Prinsessan Sophia Albertina	The Stora Stads wharf, Stockholm	402	26	134	3
Stockholms slott	The Stora Stads wharf, Stockholm	454	31	154	3
Riksens ständer	The Terra Nova wharf, Stockholm	460	34	170	3
Finland	The Stora Stads wharf, Stockholm	450	30	150	2
The third octroi 17 June 1766 – 17 June 1786
Adolph Friedric	Built as a warship, converted to an East Indiaman at the Djurgården wharf, Stockholm	493	24	160	7
Lovisa Ulrica	The Djurgården wharf, Stockholm	380	24	140	4
Cron Prins Gustaf	Designed by Fredrik Henrik af Chapman	480	28	154	6
Riksens ständer	The same ship as in the second octroi, passed on to the third octroi.	460	16	150	1
Finland	The same ship as in the second octroi, passed on to the third octroi.	450	20	150	5
Stockholms slott	The same ship as in the second octroi, passed on to the third octroi.	454	16	140	3
Drottning Sophia Magdalena	The Stora Stads wharf, Stockholm	485	18	150	4
Terra Nova	Terra Nova wharf, Stockholm	503	18	150	4 On its 4th journey, together with the Gustaf Adolph, they got off course, missing the trade wind and had to remain in port at Hainan for 10 months before continuing to Canton.
Gustaf III	The Djurgården wharf, Stockholm	512	18	155	4
Gustaf Adolph	The Stora Stads wharf, Stockholm	518	18	150	1 See Terra Nova above.
The fourth octroi 17 June 1786 – 17 June 1806
Gustaf Adolph	The same ship as in the third octroi, passed on to the fourth octroi.	518	18	150	3
Drottning Sophia Magdalena	The same ship as in the third octroi, passed on to the fourth octroi.	500	18	150	5 Lost in the English Channel; 27 October 1801
Götheborg (II)	The Viken wharf, (Note: According to Kellberg the ship was built at the Viken wharf by Jean Fredrik Roempke, but Hugo Hammar indicates the Old wharf instead. The discussion may be academic since the two wharfs were situated close to each other and in 1752, they were merged and run as a unit. The ship was built in 1786.) (Note: The wharf ("Vikens varv"), also called the Baggens wharf was founded in 1749 by Peter Samuelsson Bagge and Fredrik Henrik af Chapman. It was situated in the Majorna just west of the Old wharf; the two wharfs were later merged.) Gothenburg	530	20	170	3 Lost at Cape Town; 8 March 1796
Cron Prins Gustaf	The same ship as in the third octroi, passed on to the fourth octroi.	488 (Note: The ship was re-measured and was found to be 488.2 lästs)	18	150	1
Gustaf III	The same ship as in the third octroi, passed on to the fourth octroi.	499	29	160	5
Drottningen	The Viken wharf, Gothenburg	542	20	150	3 Lost at Humberön, Norway; 1 January 1803
Maria Carolina	France	320	10	80	3
Östergöthland	Norrköping	266	14	56	2
Westergöthland	The Old wharf, (Note: The wharf ("Gamla varvet") was founded by moving the Älvsborgs shipyard to Gothenburg sometime before 1630. It was situated below the Stigberget. The wharf was first run by Alexander Forath, a Scotsman. The wharf passed through numerous owners and at the time of the SOIC 1752–1767, it was leased by Peter Samuelsson Bagge and merged with the Viken wharf and run as one unit. Much of the wharf was destroyed in a fire in 1820.) Gothenburg	162	8	-	1 Ran aground at Cape Town; Sold in Amsterdam 1802
Fredrica	Bought in Île-de-France	243	12	56	3
Prinsessan	Karlskrona	283	16	70	2
Wasa	Karlskrona	477	20	167	1

== Flag ==
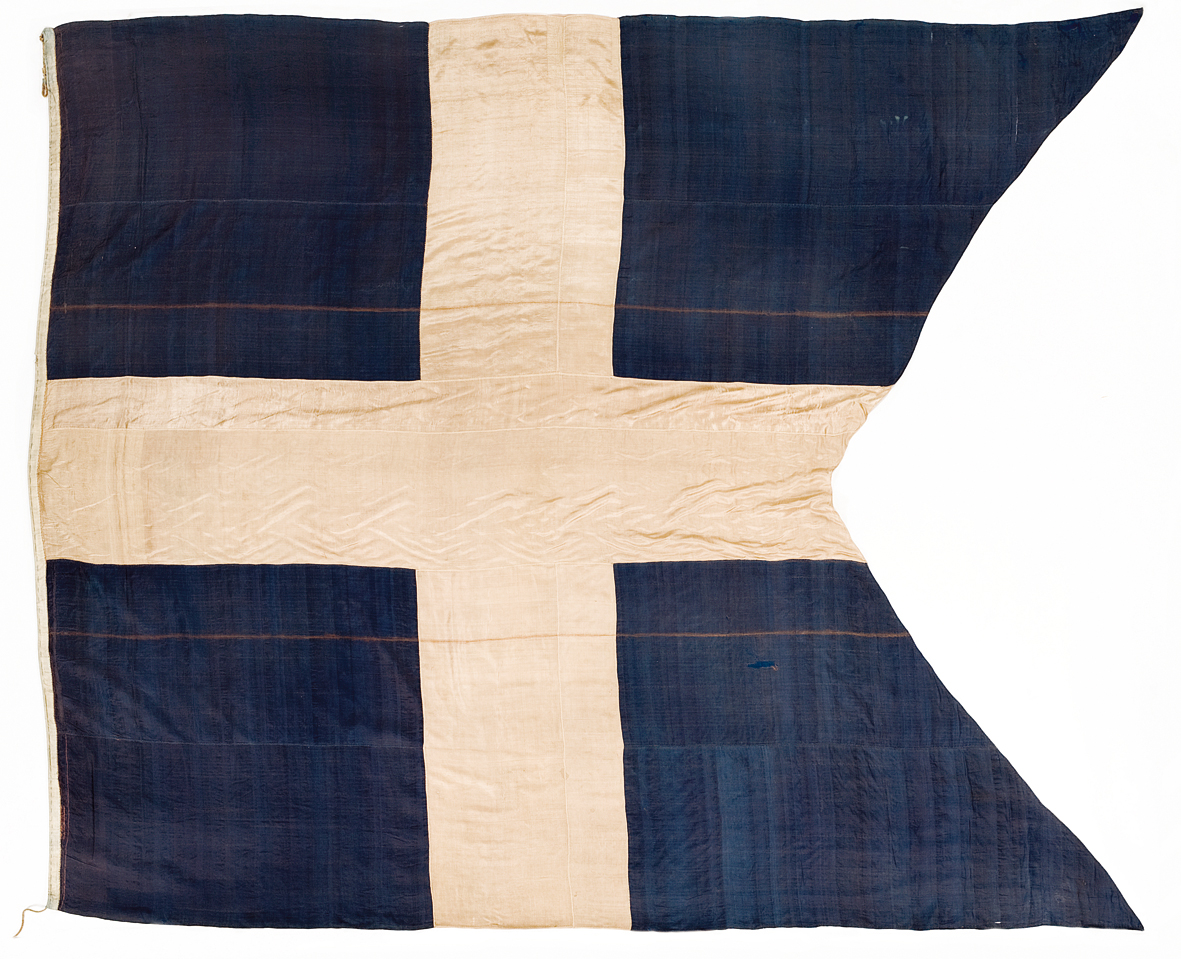
Early variant of state flag and war ensign. This design was also used on East India Company ships.

According to the first charter, the SOIC's ships were only allowed to use the Swedish merchant flag, a rectangular blue flag with a yellow cross. With the renewal of the charter in 1746, the company was allowed to add its name cypher, or monogram, to the flag in order to distinguish the ships from other trading vessels. Soon after that, the ships of the SOIC started to use a fork-tailed or swallow-tailed flag. The intention was that the ship should resemble a warship and thereby not attract pirates. Swedish warships, or ships carrying a military commander, used the Swedish ensign a triple-tailed or swallowtail and tongue version of the rectangular flag. This was against the rules and regulations for flags at that time. The use of the swallowtail was prohibited in a royal decree in 1751, but the SOIC ignored this and ordered their flags in Canton instead. The swallowtails were even used in the bow of the ships' sloops when they carried a director of the company. This was a double felony, since flags should only be used at the stern of the sloop.

The prohibition did not bother the executives in the SOIC, and the oldest preserved flag in Sweden is a swallowtail from the ship Lovisa Ulrica (to Canton 1767–68). A similar flag, ordered by SOIC director Claes Grill, is kept at Svindersvik.

There were no standardized signal flags at that time; instead, the ships used different, prearranged ways of flying the flag, or flags, sometimes combined with pennants and cannon shots, as signals. Some of these signals were just for the individual ships and some were used internationally. Sometimes this even included showing flags of other nationalities. Those flags were also used as deception if the ship was where hostile ships could be encountered and the captain wanted to avoid confrontation. There are records of ships from the SOIC approaching land under French or English flag, to collect or buy food in places where Swedish ships were forbidden to anchor.

== Modern Swedish East India Company ==
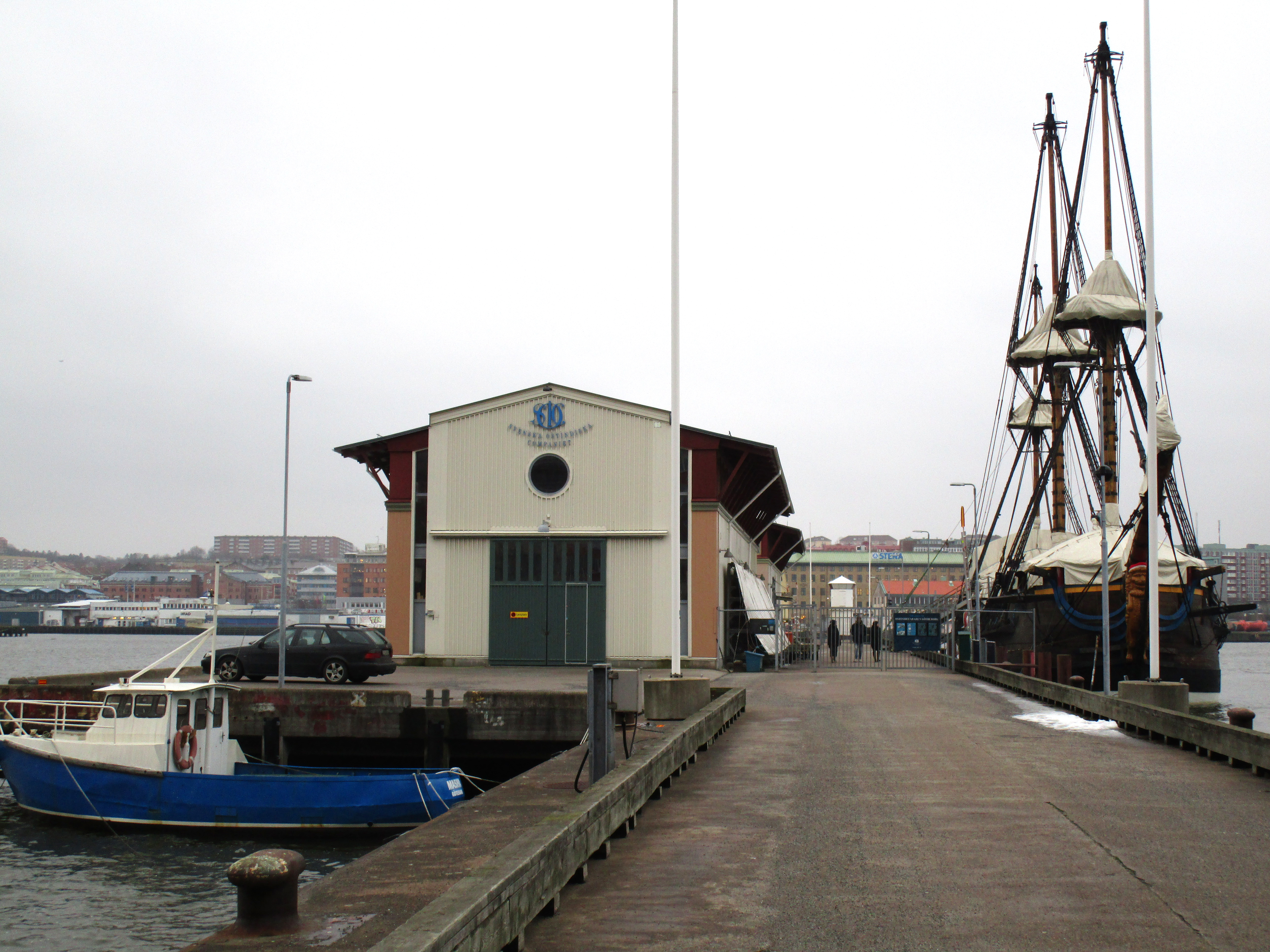
The modern SOIC headquarter at Pier Four in the Port of Gothenburg with the Götheborg prepared for winter

On 28 December 1993, a new company called the Svenska Ostindiska Companiet Aktiebolag (the Swedish East India Company Limited) was registered. It was formed to build the replica of the Götheborg. The company is registered for shipbuilding, education, research, advertising and marketing in relation to Swedish shipping and international trade. The company is located in Gothenburg. In 2013, the company's turnover was 19 million crowns. The company is a subsidiary of the Stiftelsen Ostindiefararen Götheborg (the East Indiaman Götheborg Foundation) registered in 2008.

=== Company ship replica ===
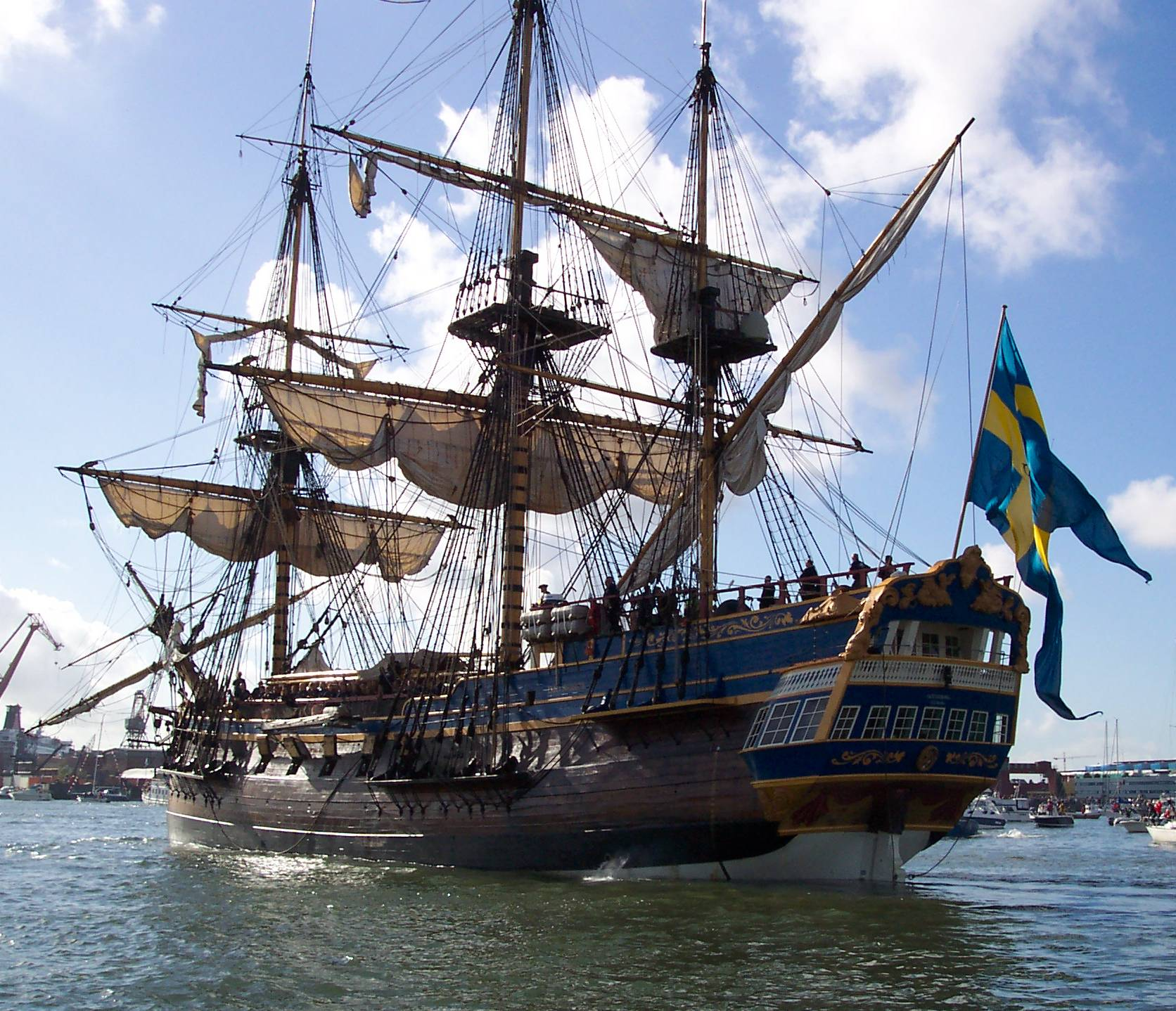
The East Indiaman Götheborg replica of the original ship leaving Gothenburg for China, 2 October 2005. It is one of the world's largest operational wooden sailing vessels.

In 1993 a project to recreate the East Indiaman Götheborg and sail her from Gothenburg to Guangzhou began. The project is run by a firm that uses the same name as the original company. The vessel was reconstructed and sailed for China in October 2005, arriving in July 2006, with a mixed crew of professionals and students. The ship has since travelled to many locations and maritime events across the world.

The actual name of the replica is Götheborg III. It is a replica of the Götheborg that sank outside Gothenburg in 1745. A second ship with the same name was built in Gothenburg in 1786. It was the second largest, (the largest being the Drottningen), of all the SOIC vessels and made three journeys to Canton: 2 February 1788 – 13 May 1790, 13 November 1791 – 12 June 1793, and on 5 December 1795, the ship sailed for Canton but was lost at Cape Town on 8 March 1796, on the way out from Gothenburg.

== See also ==
- William Chalmers, Swedish merchant of Scottish origin, director of the Swedish East India Company
- Anders Ljungstedt, Swedish merchant.
- Niclas Sahlgren, Swedish merchant, director of the Swedish East India Company.
- Swedish South Company, founded in 1626.
- Swedish West India Company, founded in 1786
- East India Company, (England) founded in 1600
- Danish East India Company, founded in 1616
- Danish West India Company, founded in 1671
- Dutch East India Company, founded in 1602
- Dutch West India Company, founded in 1621
- Portuguese East India Company, founded in 1628
- French East India Company, founded in 1664
- List of trading companies
- Whampoa anchorage
