= Magnus Mandersson =

Swedish businessman (born 1959)

- Born: 12 May 1959 (age 67); Gothenburg, Sweden
- Citizenship: Luxembourg
- Education: Lund University
- Occupations: Director and senior advisor
- Children: 2

Magnus Mandersson (born 12 May 1959) is a Swedish businessman. He was executive vice president at telecommunications company Ericsson from 2011 to 2017, and is currently chairman of Tampnet AS, Karnov Group and NEXT Biometrics.

== Biography ==
Magnus currently serves as the chairman of Tampnet AS, operating the world's largest offshore communication network, Karnov Group, providing legal and tax related information services, and NEXT Biometrics, developing biometric authentication tools. He is also a member of the Advisory Council of Interogo Foundation.

At Ericsson, his last role was as head of Business Unit Global Services. Prior to assuming this role in 2010, he had been responsible for Business Unit CDMA Mobile Systems, Ericsson's businesses in Northern Europe, the Global Customer Account Deutsche Telekom AG and Managed Services business globally.

Preceding his work at Ericsson, he has held management positions within the Swedish conglomerate Kinnevik, as both COO of Millicom SA and CEO of Tele2 Europe. Mandersson also held the position as the first President of Comviq Vietnam/Mobifone in 1994. In the beginning of his career, he worked at IKEA in Europe and Asia.

Mandersson holds a Bachelor's degree in Business Administration from Lund University. He has been residing, with his family, in Luxembourg since 1997.
