= William Chalmers (merchant) =

Swedish merchant and freemason (1748 – 1811)

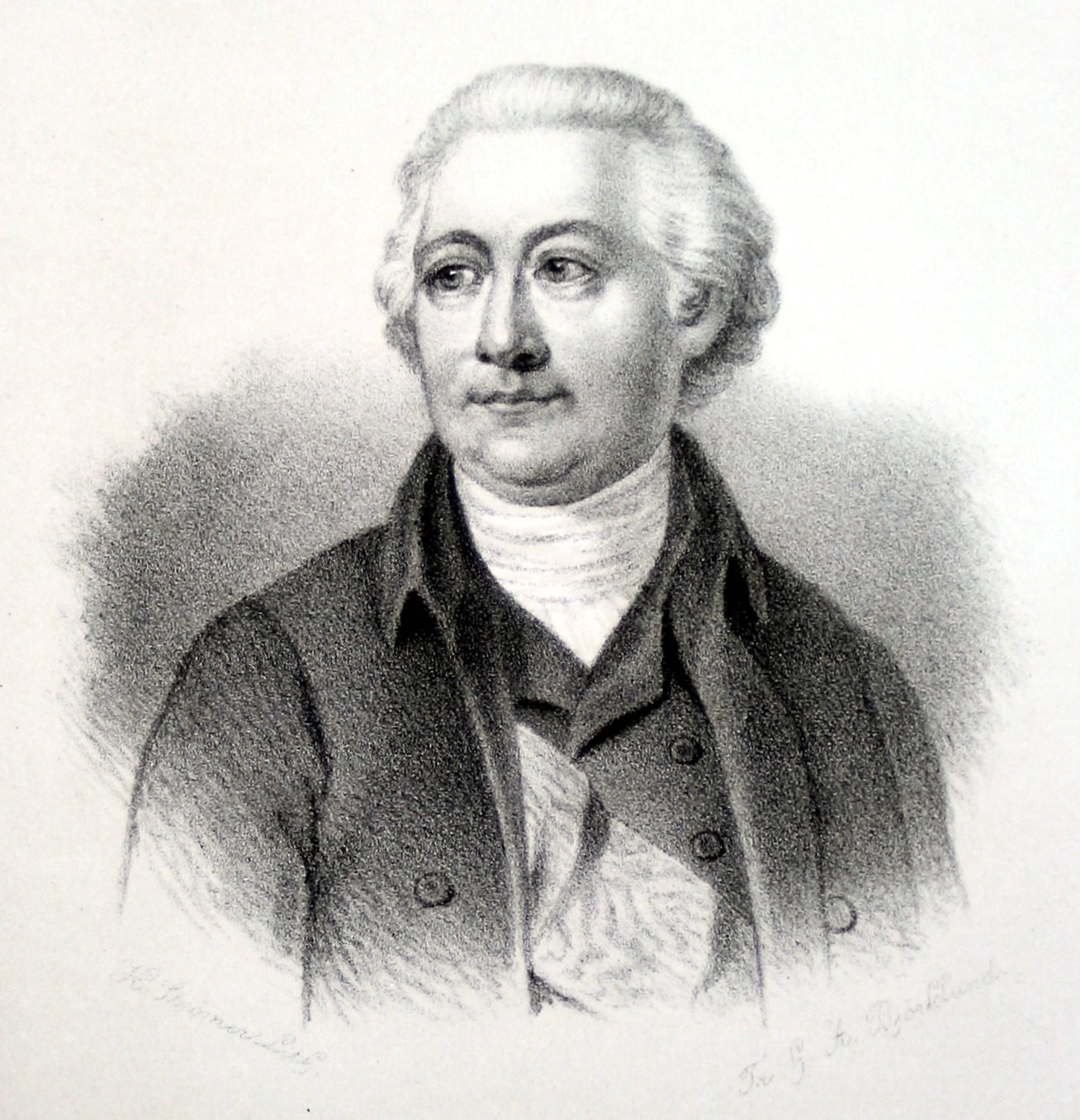
William Chalmers

William Chalmers (/ˈtʃɑːmərz/, Swedish: [ˈɕǎlːmɛʂ]; 13 November 1748 – 3 July 1811) was a Swedish merchant and freemason. He was born in Gothenburg in 1748 to the Scottish merchant William Chalmers Sr. and his Swedish wife, Inga Orre. William Chalmers Jr. was eldest amongst his brothers James, George Andreas and Charles Chalmers. He became a director of the Swedish East India Company and in 1783 he was appointed as their resident representative in Canton. He would stay there and in Macau for ten years before returning home. He died in Gothenburg in 1811, leaving half his fortune to the Sahlgrenska hospital, Gothenburg. After some other donations, the remainder was donated to create a crafting school for poor children, which in 1829 became a university that today is named the Chalmers University of Technology.

== Career ==
Chalmers studied commerce and marketing in Gothenburg and Great Britain, before continuing his studies in a travelling manner to France and the Dutch Republic. At the age of 35, he was nominated to become the purchaser of the Swedish East India Company in Canton, China, which became his most enriching investment.

== Swedish East India Company ==
In 1793, when Chalmers was 45 years old, he had been living in Canton for ten years. Afterwards, he returned to Sweden as the manager of the Swedish East India Company as well as the manager of Trollhätte Kanalverk (a canal that runs through Trollhättan). He faithfully contributed to the finalization of the canal and was able to leave the company seven years later (1800). Six years post the finalization of the canal, the last Swedish East India Company-ship arrived into Sweden. On it was merchandise from China and Spain. The imports from Spain and China allowed Sweden to widen its international relations, thus the porcelain from China and the silver from Spain was exported to other countries, as well as Sweden's own products: wood, iron and artillery.
