= Kwame Amoateng =

Swedish footballer

Personal information
- Date of birth: 8 August 1987 (age 39)
- Place of birth: Gothenburg, Sweden
- Position: Striker

Youth career
- –2004: Grimsby Town
- 2004–2005: Lundby IF

Senior career*
Years	Team	Apps	(Gls)
2005– ????	GAIS	5	(1)
2006	→ FC Trollhättan (loan)		
2007	→ Husqvarna FF (loan)		
2008	→ Skärhamns IK (loan)		

International career^{‡}
2006	Sweden U19	2	(0)
- * Club domestic league appearances and goals as of 17:30, 13 June 2009 (UTC) ‡ National team caps and goals as of 17:30, 13 June 2009 (UTC)

Kwame Amoateng (born 8 August 1987) is a Swedish former professional footballer/

== Early life ==
Born in Gothenburg, Sweden to parents from Ghana, Amoateng was raised in England by Jamaican adoptive parents.

== Career ==
=== Club career ===
Amoateng began his career in England with Grimsby Town, before moving onto Lundby IF in Sweden. While at GAIS he has spent loan spells with FC Trollhättan and Husqvarna FF.

== International career ==
Amoateng has been a member of the Sweden men's national under-19 football team.
