= Niclas Sahlgren =

Swedish merchant and philanthropist

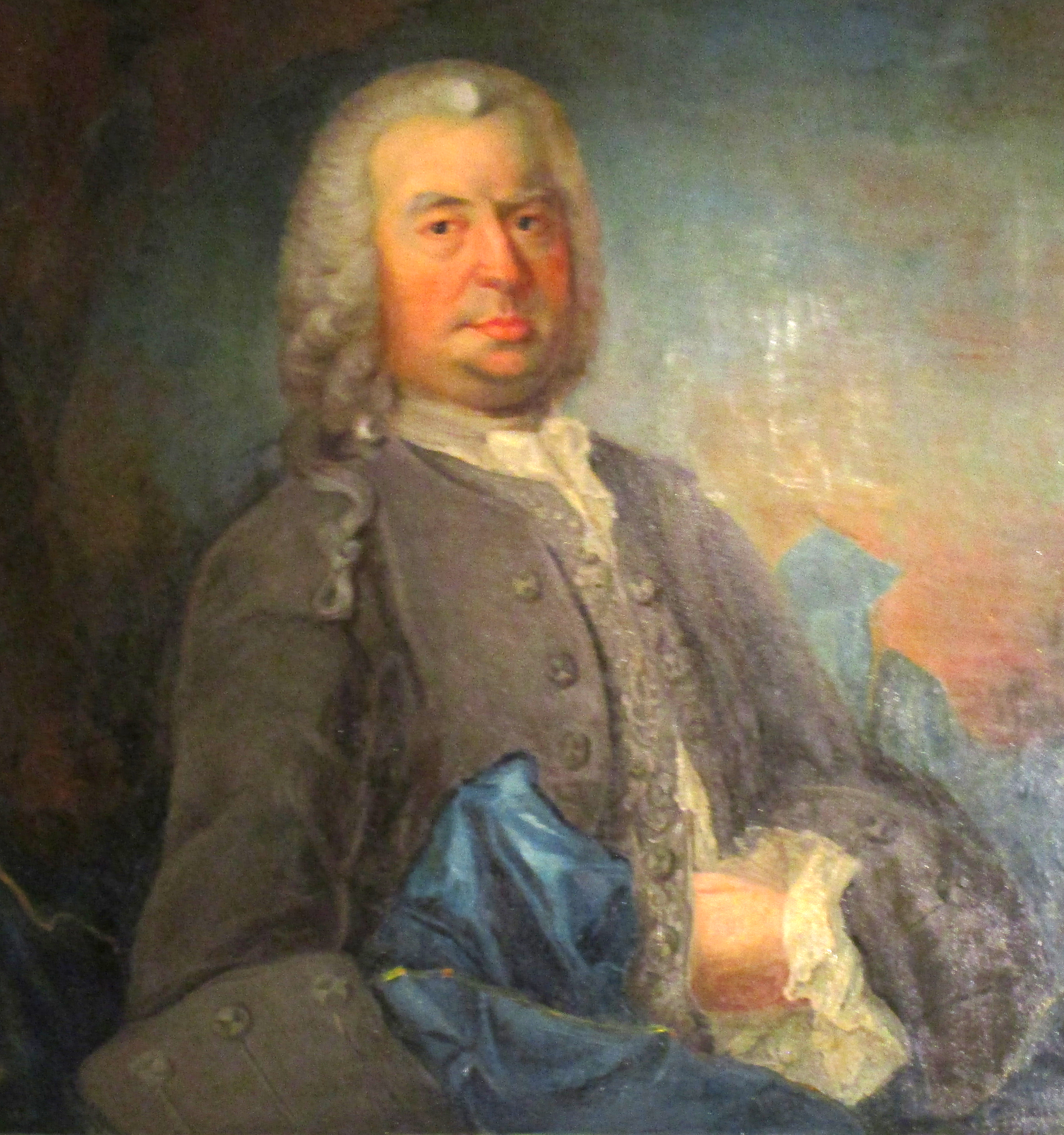
Niclas Sahlgren

Niclas Sahlgren (in full Nicolaus Sahlgren) (18 March 1701 – 10 March 1776), was a Swedish merchant and philanthropist.

Born into a wealthy merchant family in Gothenburg as the son of Nils Pehrsson Sahlgren and Sara Herwegh, Sahlgren was sent at the age of 16 as an apprentice to the Tietzen & Schröder trading house in Amsterdam, where he learned languages and other aspects of trade. Several additional years of travels on the European continent, to England, and in Sweden, gained him experience, knowledge of natural resources and important contacts. He settled in Gothenburg again on the death of his mother and became a burgess of Gothenburg in 1733. He was one of the founders of the Swedish East India Company and one of its directors from 1733 to 1768.

A large part of his wealth, left for the creation of a benefactory institution of some kind, was used to found a hospital named after Sahlgren in Gothenburg, the present Sahlgrenska University Hospital.

In 1773, Sahlgren was elected a member of the Royal Swedish Academy of Sciences.
