= Uylenburgh =

Uylenburgh is a surname. Notable people with the surname include:

- Gerrit van Uylenburgh (1625–1679), or Gerrit Uylenburgh, Dutch art-dealer
- Hendrick van Uylenburg (1587–1661), Dutch Golden Age art dealer
- Rombertus van Uylenburgh (1554–1624), best known as father of Saskia van Uylenburgh, wife of Rembrandt
- Saskia van Uylenburg (1612–1642), wife of the Dutch painter Rembrandt van Rijn
