= Jürgen Ovens =

Dutch painter (1623–1678)

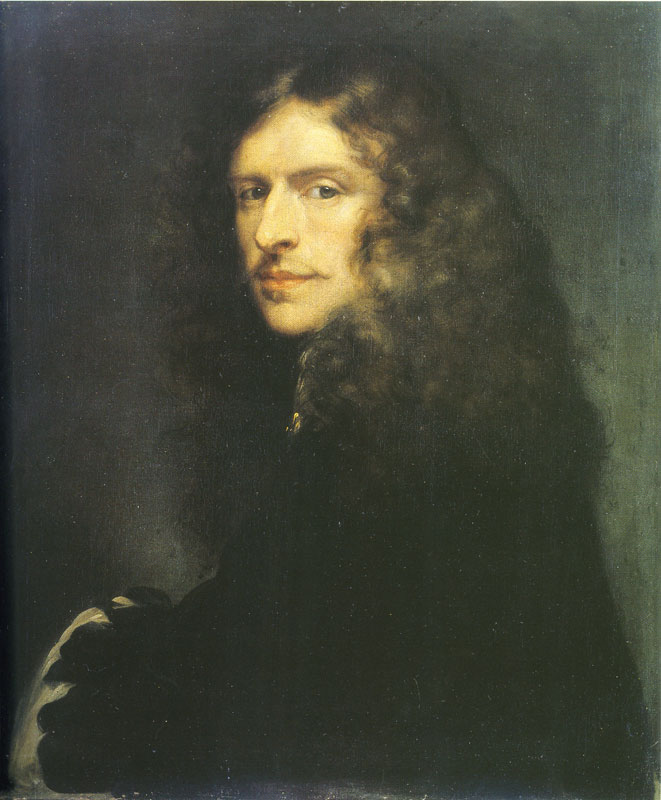
- Self-portrait, c. 1650
- Born: 1623; Tönning
- Died: 9 December 1678 (aged 54–55); Friedrichstadt
- Education: Under Rembrandt
- Known for: Painting
- Notable work: Blue Madonna in Schleswig Cathedral
- Movement: Baroque

Jürgen Ovens (1623 – 9 December 1678), also known as Georg, or Jurriaen Ovens whilst in the Netherlands, was a portrait painter and art-dealer from North Frisia and, according to Arnold Houbraken, a pupil of Rembrandt. He is best known for his painting in the city hall of Amsterdam and paintings for the Dukes of Holstein-Gottorp for whom he worked for more than 30 years, also as an art dealer.

== Life ==
Ovens was born and grew up in Tönning, Duchy of Schleswig, the son of Frisian farmer and alderman Ove Broders and Agneta Ovens (also called Broders). Although that duchy was formally a Danish fief, Ovens is often counted among German painters. Since 1640 he worked for Hendrick van Uylenburgh with Govaert Flinck in the Sint Antoniesbreestraat. It has been suggested he went to Italy between 1643 and 1649, but there is no evidence. Until 1651, he lived in Amsterdam, then from May 1651 he went back to Schleswig-Holstein, claimed by Frederick III, Duke of Holstein-Gottorp. In 1652 he married Maria Jens Martens (daughter of a rich Tönning alderman) in Friedrichstadt. His father-in-law gave him 60,000 Thaler, but demanded that he settle down nearby.

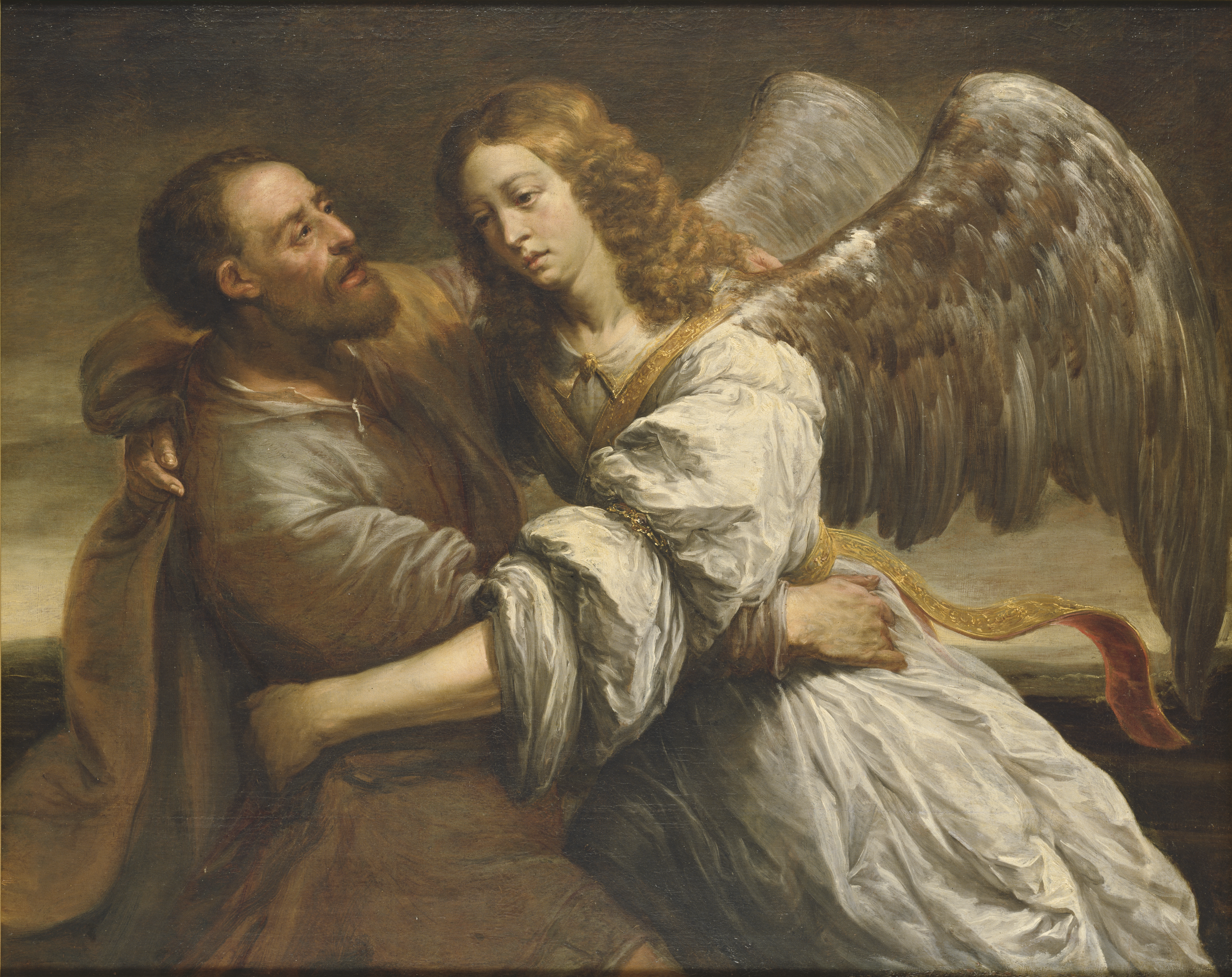
Jacob Fighting the Angel, Nationalmuseum, Stockholm, Sweden

In 1654 Ovens spent a few weeks in Stockholm to paint the marriage between Charles X Gustav and Hedwig Eleonora of Holstein-Gottorp. In 1655 Gerrit van Uylenburgh came to visit him. In 1657 Ovens travelled to Amsterdam because of a war between the Swedish and the Danish. He cooperated with Govert Flinck. Ovens became a citizen of Amsterdam in order to start a business or to get a job, as the rules of guilds were very strict. He also sent statues by Artus Quellinus the Elder to Gottorf.

Ovens was living in the Jordaan in a canalhouse with a large studio under the roof. He rented out the cellar as a public house, just like Flinck did, who used to own it and died the year before. The art-dealer Gerrit van Uylenburgh bought the house next door owned by Flinck. Johannes Lingelbach was a friend and a witness when his children were baptized in the Lutheran church. In 1661 Ovens was asked to finish a painting begun by Flinck. The painting had to be placed in the town hall, within a few days, when Rembrandt's painting The Conspiracy of Claudius Civilis was rejected. Ovens was paid 48 guilders, very little compared to the others, but still a good salary in those days.

In 1663 Ovens returned to Friedrichstadt at the instruction of Christian Albert, Duke of Holstein-Gottorp, as one of the richest inhabitants. He invited Johannes Voorhout to work for him, but the painter declined the offer. From 1674 to 1675, he lived again in Holland and painted Michiel de Ruyter and Joan Huydecoper van Maarsseveen. After returning to Schleswig he painted the altarpiece of St. Christopher's in Friedrichstadt, painting himself in its top right section. His grave is also in the church.

Ovens owned six painting by Anthony van Dyck and three by Jacob Jordaens, Rubens, etc.

== Works ==
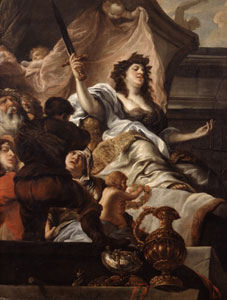
Jürgen Ovens's Justitia, 1663–1665, Museumsberg Flensburg. Ovens painted himself on the left.

Ovens was appreciated for his portraits and painted Nicolaes Tulp twice, his daughter Margaretha Tulp, her brother Dirk and his wife Anna Burgh. He also painted a portrait of the parents of Godert de Ginkell, 1st Earl of Athlone, John Amos Comenius, Maarten Tromp, Charles II of England, John Hutchinson, Adam Olearius, three times Christina of Sweden, Queen Sophie Amalie of Denmark, Jacob Backer, Jacques Specx, Lucia Wijbrants, Dirck Kerckring and twice Giuseppe Francesco Borri, an eye doctor, charlatan and alchemist.

Ovens' best-known work is the Blue Madonna in Schleswig Cathedral. A self-portrait may be seen in the Laurentius-Kirche in Tönning. Further works by Ovens can be found in the collections of the Schleswig-Holsteinischen Landesmuseums at the Schloss Gottorf. He made 45 paintings for the Amalienburg in Gottorf. The Earl of Arundel (or his grandmother Aletheia Talbot?) owned seventeen paintings by Ovens, belonging to a collection of 78 paintings which were sold on September 26, 1684, in Amsterdam. According to Schmidt there is nothing German in his paintings and he belongs to the Dutch School of painting.
