= The Conspiracy of Claudius Civilis =

Painting by Rembrandt

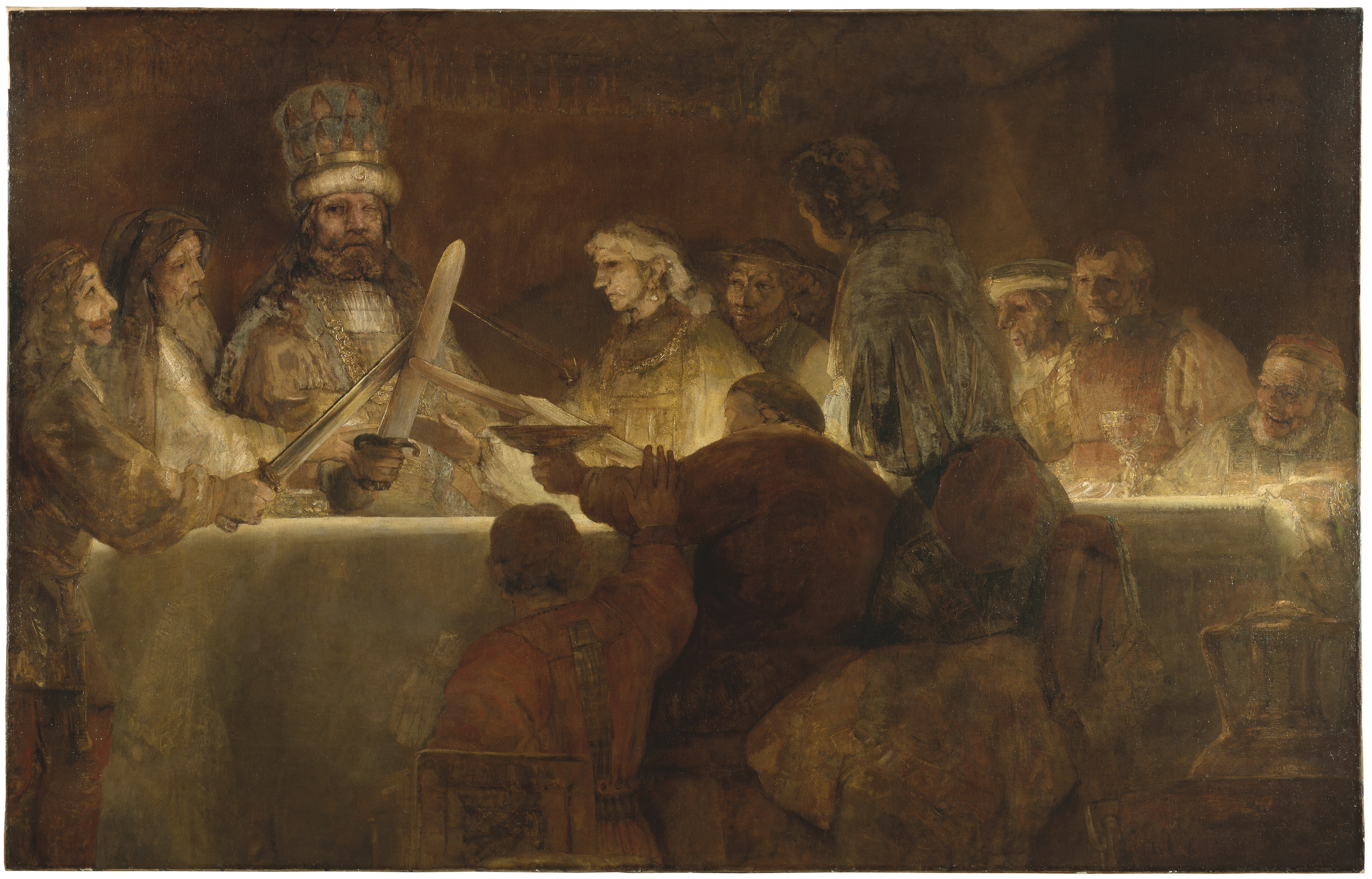
- central fragment
- Artist: Rembrandt
- Year: c. 1661–62
- Type: Oil on canvas
- Dimensions: 196 cm × 309 cm (77 in × 122 in)
- Location: Nationalmuseum, Stockholm
- Owner: Royal Swedish Academy of Fine Arts
- Website: Nationalmuseum Collection online

The Conspiracy of Claudius Civilis (Dutch: De samenzwering van de Bataven onder Claudius Civilis) is an oil painting by the Dutch painter Rembrandt, c. 1661–62, which was originally the largest he ever painted, at about five by five metres in the shape of a lunette. The painting was commissioned by the Amsterdam city council for the Town Hall. After the work had been in place briefly, it was returned to Rembrandt, who may have never been paid. Rembrandt drastically cut down the painting to a quarter of the original size to be sold. It is the last secular history painting he finished.

The painting is on exhibition at Nationalmuseum in Stockholm, Sweden.

== Depiction ==
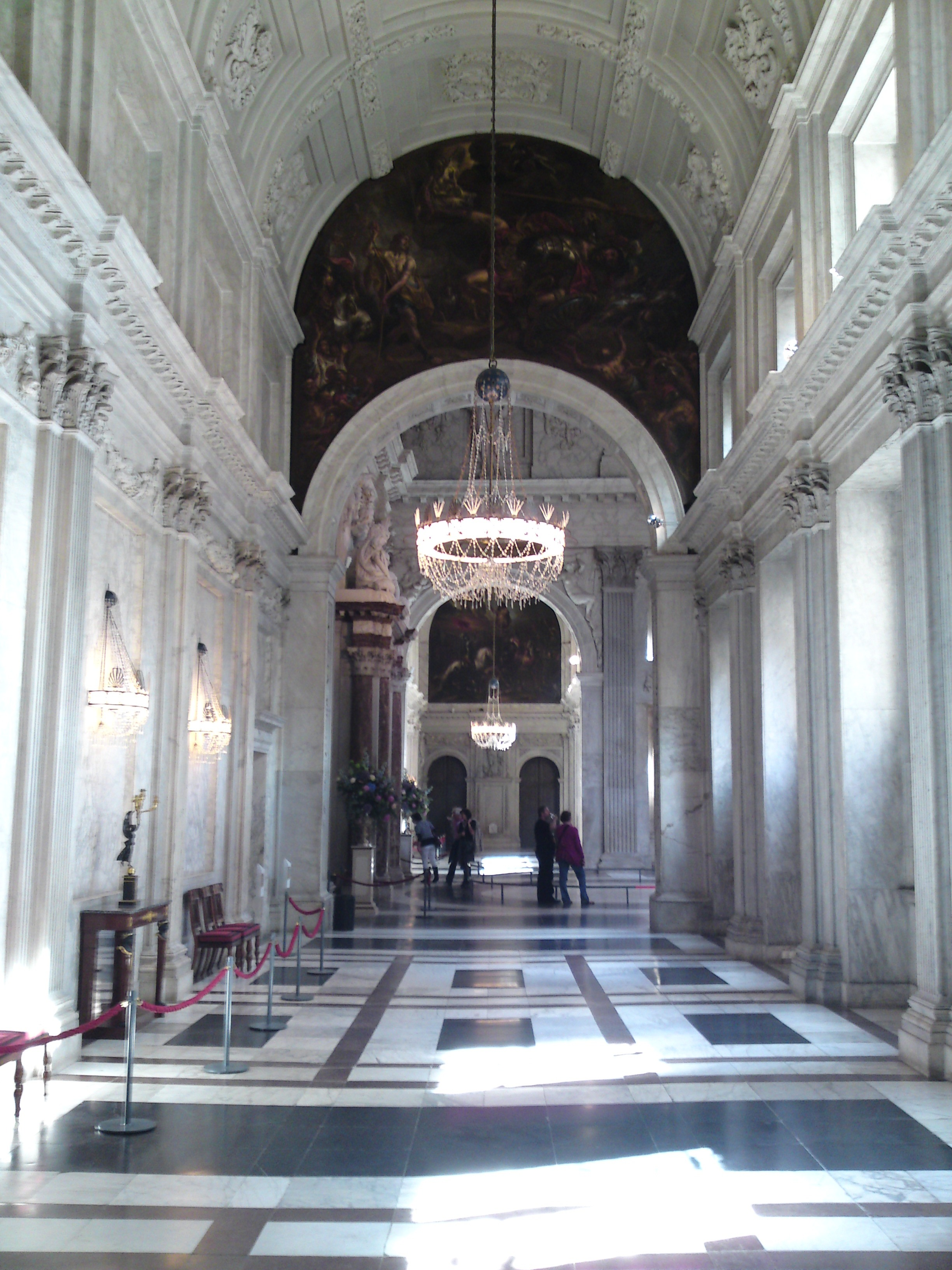
Inside the palace on the second floor, with one of the lunettes by Jordaens

The painting follows Tacitus's Histories in depicting an episode from the Batavian rebellion (69–70 AD), led by the one-eyed chieftain Claudius Civilis (actually called Julius Civilis by Tacitus, though but once, Claudius Civilis has since become entrenched in art history), in which he "collected at one of the sacred groves, ostensibly for a banquet, the chiefs of the nation and the boldest spirits of the lower class", convinced them to join his rebellion, and then "bound the whole assembly with barbarous rites and strange forms of oath."

Civilis, Tacitus writes, "was unusually intelligent for a native, and passed himself off as a second Sertorius or Hannibal, whose facial disfigurement he shared"—that is to say, the loss of one eye. He feigned friendship with Emperor Vespasian in order to regain his freedom. When he returned to his tribal grounds in the marshes of the Betuwe, he organized the revolt he had long been planning.

== Commission ==
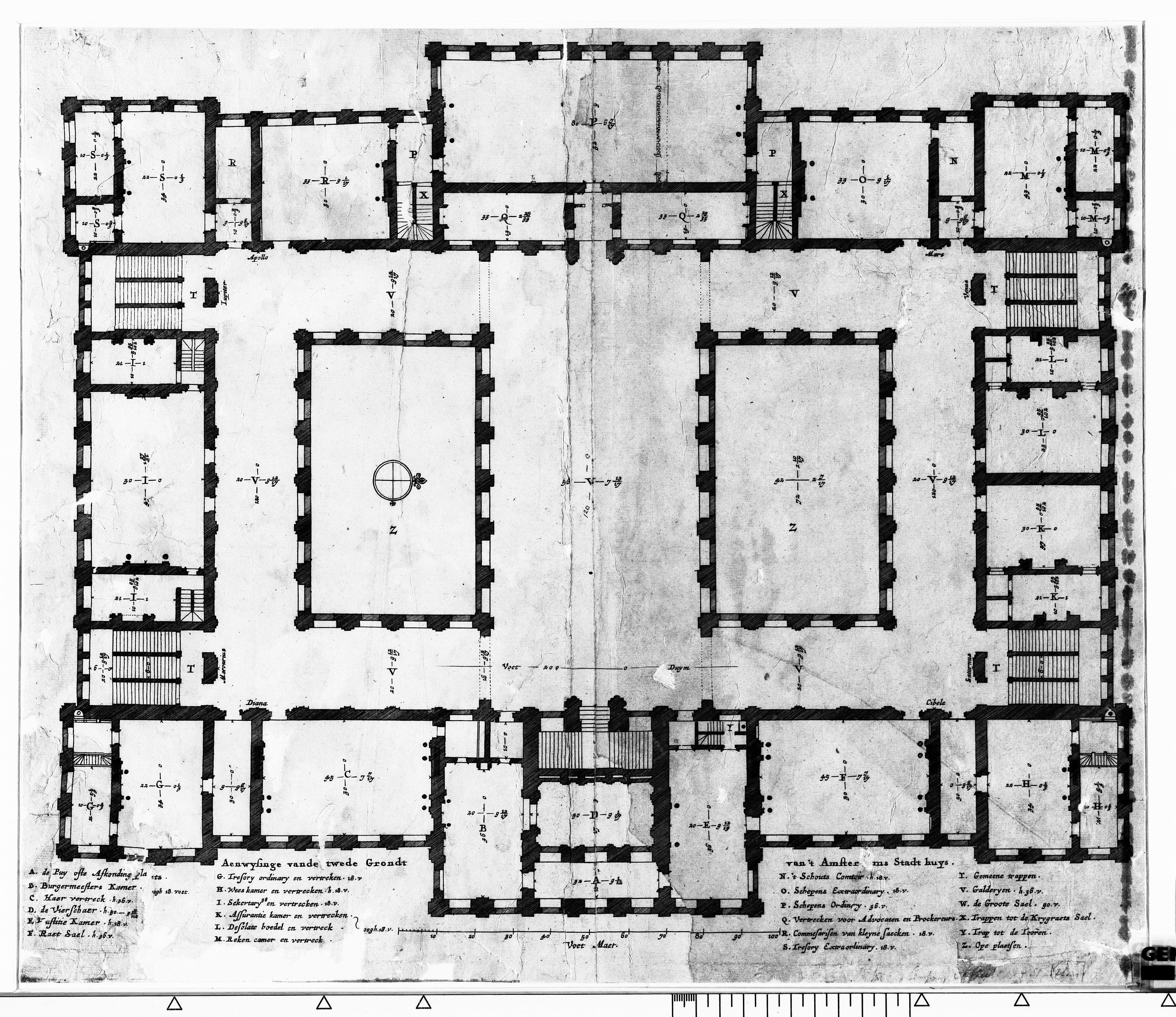
Floorplan second floor (1661). Rembrandt's Conspiracy was in the lower left corner.

The painting was commissioned for the gallery of the new city hall on the Dam, finished in 1655 (now the Royal Palace). History paintings were regarded as the highest in the hierarchy of genres in the 17th century (a view Rembrandt shared), and the Batavian revolt was regarded, and romanticised, as a precursor of the recently ended war against the Spanish. In 1659, when John Maurice of Nassau, Amalia of Solms-Braunfels, her two daughters and two daughters-in-law came to see the new building, the council commissioned twelve paintings from Rembrandt's ex-pupil Govert Flinck to fill all the large spaces using a programme drawn up by the poet Joost van den Vondel, but Flink died in 1660 before completing any of the works. The work was then shared out by the burgomasters Joan Huydecoper and Andries de Graeff, who were certainly decisive, between a number of painters including Jacob Jordaens and Jan Lievens. The council provided the canvas to the artist. Rembrandt was commissioned to do the scene from Tacitus, one of eight intended to cover the revolt in the original scheme.

== Treatment and reception ==
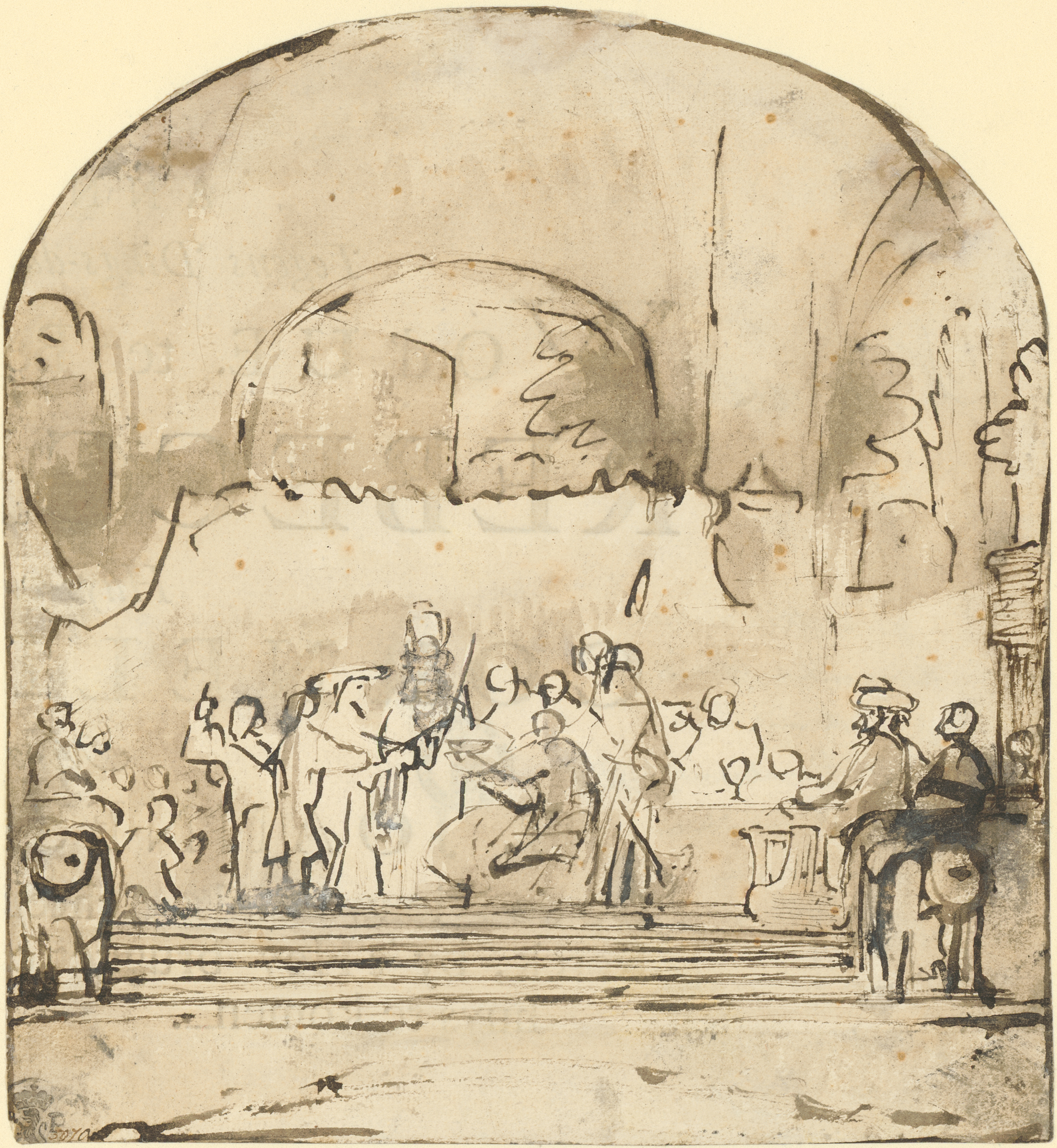
Funeral ticket sketch (see text), October 1661 or later

The sword-oath was invented by Rembrandt. There is one sword more in the painting—the one touching the front of the leader's blade—than Batavians holding them; other depictions of the event show handshakes, especially that engraved in 1612 by Antonio Tempesta as one of a set of thirty-six illustrations to designs by Otto van Veen in the book Batavorum cum Romanis bellum on the revolt. In the following year, the States General had commissioned a set of twelve paintings by Van Veen on the same subject for The Hague. These baroque works had entered the popular imagination as depictions of the revolt, and Flinck's design drew on the engraving of this scene. Van Veen followed baroque ideas of decorum by always showing Civilis in profile, with only his good eye visible.

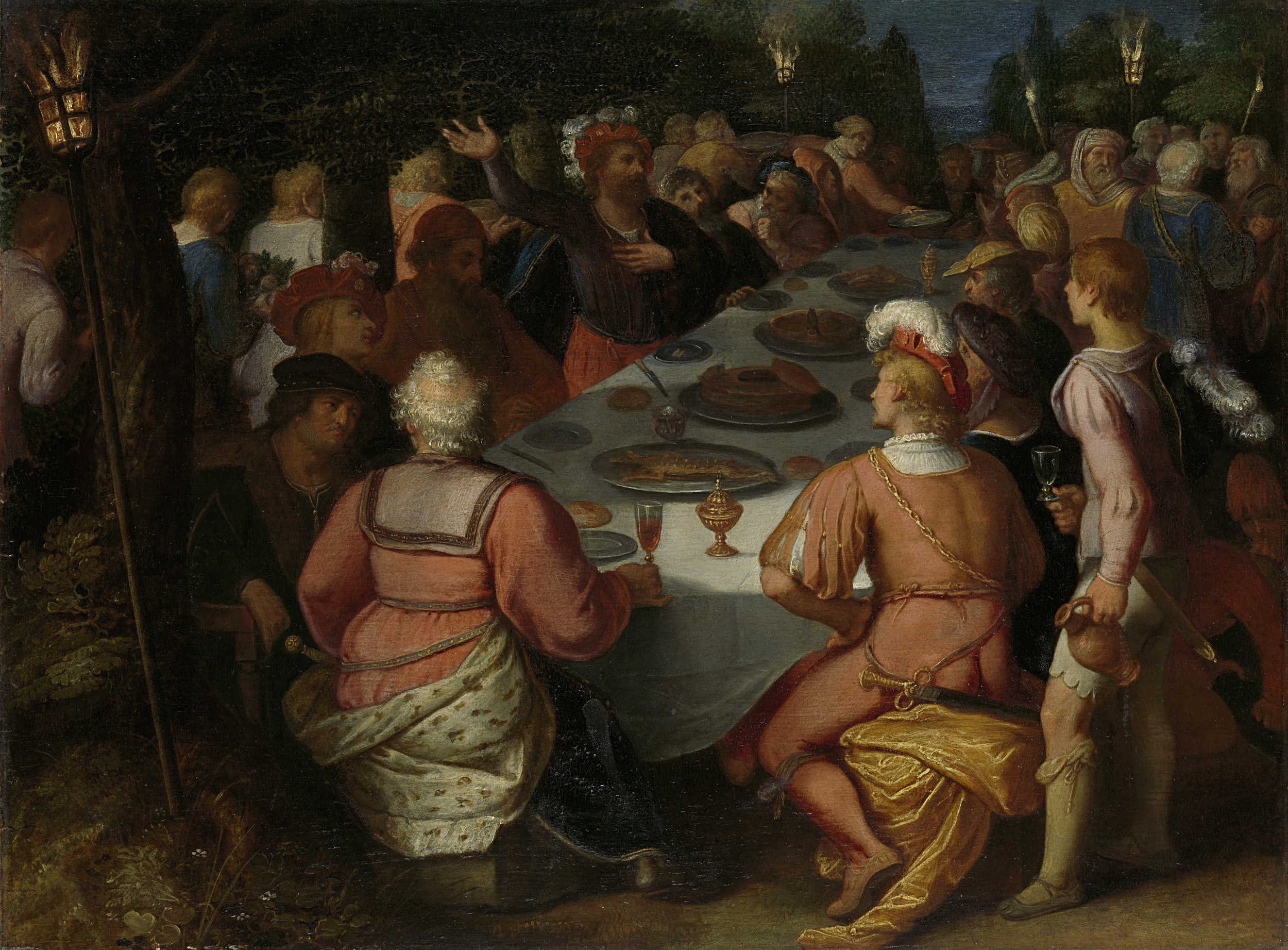
The Conspiracy of Claudius Civilis and the Batavians in the Schakerbos by Otto van Veen

A sketch survives (on the back of a funeral ticket dated October 1661) that shows that he had transferred the scene from Tacitus's "sacred grove" to a large vaulted hall with open arches. After delivery, which was by July 1662, the painting hung in place for a short period before being returned to him for reasons that are undocumented, but may have involved perceptions of a lack of the decorum felt necessary for history painting, lack of finish and an insufficiently heroic approach to the story. When all four paintings were in place, the discrepancy was evident. The council probably expected something similar in style, rather than the ominous grandeur of Rembrandt's conception. The chiaroscuro is typical of Rembrandt's late works, but the "eerie light and shadow and the iridescent greyish blues and pale yellows" are not.

In August 1662, when the painting was still there, Rembrandt signed an agreement giving a "quarter-share of his profits accruing from the piece for the City Hall and his prospective earnings from it." By 24 September 1662, however, when the archbishop and elector of Cologne Maximilian Henry of Bavaria was received in the town hall, Rembrandt's painting was gone. One objection may well have been the incongruous crown that Rembrandt had set upon Claudius Civilis's head and his dominating the scene, hardly features of a consultative, republican attitude. Blankert suggested that the painting had too much dark, unused space, compared with the others who had filled the image space with figures in a more conventional manner.

For Kenneth Clark:

one need only look at the surviving fragment to see why official opinion could not accept it.... It is a most marvellous picture, but in places it borders on the absurd. The word Shakespearean is, for once, justifiable. Rembrandt has evoked the kind of quasi-mythical, heroic-magical past that is the setting for King Lear and Cymbeline, and, as with Shakespeare, this remoteness has allowed him to insert into an episode of primitive grandeur the life-giving roughage of the grotesque [the figures at the extreme sides].

Crenshaw writes that Rembrandt was away for a couple of months, and "... he did not have enough supporters in the right places when obstacles arose." Instead, Flinck's unfinished work was retrieved and rapidly finished off by the German painter Jürgen Ovens in four days. Ovens, then living in the house and using the studio formerly owned by Flinck, got paid 48 guilders for his work, whereas Flinck was promised 12,000 guilders for the series of twelve paintings. Jordaens and Lievens received 1,200 guilders for each of their works. In financial difficulties, Rembrandt was forced to cut it down drastically for easier sale and partly repainted it. The table was elongated, and he added the man on the left. In the next few months, Rembrandt was forced to sell the grave of his wife, Saskia.

== Later history ==
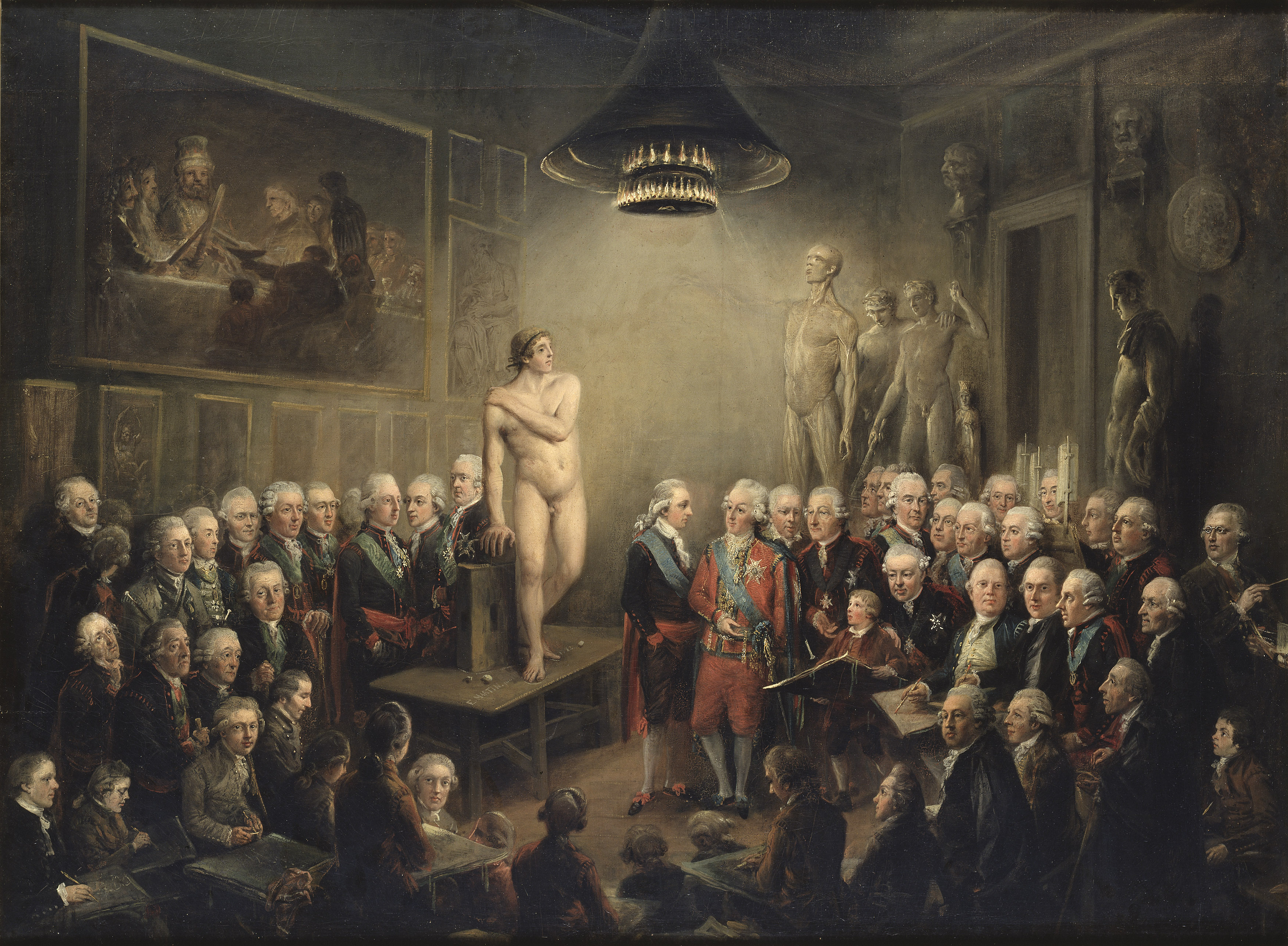
Gustav III of Sweden at the Royal Academy of Arts. Painting by Elias Martin (1782).

On 10 August 1734, the painting was bought at auction in Amsterdam by the merchant Nicolaas Kohl from Arensborg (1675–1751). Supposedly it came to Sweden as inheritance from Kohl's widow, Sophia Grill, who died in 1766 in Zwammerdam (Netherlands). It was acquired by Anna Johanna Grill, the sole daughter of the wealthy Claes Grill. Anna Johanna (1745–1801) was married to the Stockholm merchant Henrik Wilhelm Peill (1730–1797). Probably on the advice of artist friends, perhaps because of its size, Peill deposited the painting at the Royal Swedish Academy of Arts. It can be seen hanging on the wall in the background of a painting by Elias Martin of the visit of King Gustav III to the Academy in 1782. In 1785 the painting was transferred to the Stockholm Palace. In 1798, the work was donated to the Academy of Fine Arts by Anna Johanna Grill, the widow of Peill and the sister of Adolf Ulric Grill, who was a member and for a while president of the Academy.

Peill, who had previously supported the King financially in his coup d'état in 1772, complied, and a plan of the royal collection shows the painting in a central position in one of the galleries. Around 1782, the painting was restored by conservator Erik Hallblad. Hallblad (1720–1814), who had developed or learnt a method for transferring an oil painting from one canvas to another, removed the paint layer from Rembrandt's original canvas and attached it to a new one. Some damage appears to have occurred during this risky process; the extra sword now seen on the painting was probably added by Hallblad to mask this. The painting is still owned by the Academy of Arts but has been deposited since 1864 in the Nationalmuseum in Stockholm.

In the beginning of the twentieth century, a Danish author, Karl Madsen, noticed the sketch from Munich and assumed that Rembrandt—after his bankruptcy—fled to Sweden. He suggested that Rembrandt had painted the one-eyed Northern god, king and priest Odin. In fact, Rembrandt's burial in Westerkerk was discovered in 1866, and the true history of the painting had been published in 1891.

In March 2008, the Academy valued the painting at 750 million kronor (£61m, or $123m), but then put it on sale at 300 million kronor (£24m, or $49m—that is, at a 60% discount), on the condition that it be deposited straight back to the museum, and shown there as before, after purchase. This unusual measure was taken in order to raise money for exhibitions and other activities. Ultimately the painting did not find a buyer, and the Academy retained ownership.

The painting later traveled to Amsterdam for an exhibition on Late Rembrandt, and was on display at the Rijksmuseum next to The Night Watch.

From May 2017 till September 2018, the painting was the centerpiece of a special Rembrandt exhibit at the Gothenburg Museum of Art in Gothenburg, Sweden.

Thereafter it returned to the National Museum, which pays the Academy SEK400,000 per annum to display it. In 2023 an anonymous donor provided funding to allow the arrangement to continue.

The painting will be loaned to and exhibited at New York City's Metropolitan Museum of Art in 2027.

== See also ==
- List of paintings by Rembrandt
