= Gerrit van Uylenburgh =

Dutch painter

Gerrit van Uylenburgh (c. 1625 – 1679), also known as Gerrit Uylenburgh, was a Dutch Golden Age painter and art-dealer. He was the eldest son of Hendrick van Uylenburgh and took over the family art-dealing business after Hendrick's death and burial in the Westerkerk church in 1661. This business, then in a house on Lauriergracht, formerly owned by Govaert Flinck, played a key role in the art world of the Dutch Golden Age.

== Life ==
According to biographer Arnold Houbraken, van Uylenburgh began as a landscape painter and painted rooms in the house of a wealthy man in Amsterdam. He soon saw he could earn more money dealing in art than in painting himself. Like his father he took young promising painters into his service, such as Hendrick Fromantiou, Jurriaen Ovens and Gerard de Lairesse. He expanded the business internationally and sold many Italian masters and classical sculptures alongside Dutch art. The English painter Peter Lely and king John II Casimir of Poland both had Gerrit as their agent. In 1660 he advised the Cornelis and his younger brother, Andries de Graeff, one of the heads of the States-General of the Netherlands on their lavish Dutch Gift to Charles II of England.

In 1671 he organised the auction of Gerrit Reynst's collection and offered thirteen paintings and some sculptures from among those which had not sold at the auction to Frederick William, Elector of Brandenburg. However, on Fromantiou's advice, Frederick accused them of being counterfeits and sent them back. Van Uylenburg then organized a counter-assessment, asking a total of 35 painters to pronounce on their authenticity, including Jan Lievens, Melchior de Hondecoeter, Gerbrand van den Eeckhout, Barend Graat and Johannes Vermeer.

Van Uylenburgh hit financial problems in 1675, as a result of the war with France, falling art prices, and possibly due to the damage to his reputation from the Brandenburg affair. His business went bankrupt and Gerrit moved to London, where Lely exerted his influence at court and secured him the post of Surveyor of the King’s Pictures. He died in 1679.

In 2006 the Rembrandt House Museum presented an exhibition about Hendrick and Gerrit. The exhibition was also shown at the Dulwich Picture Gallery in London.
