= A Young Archer =

Painting by Govert Flinck

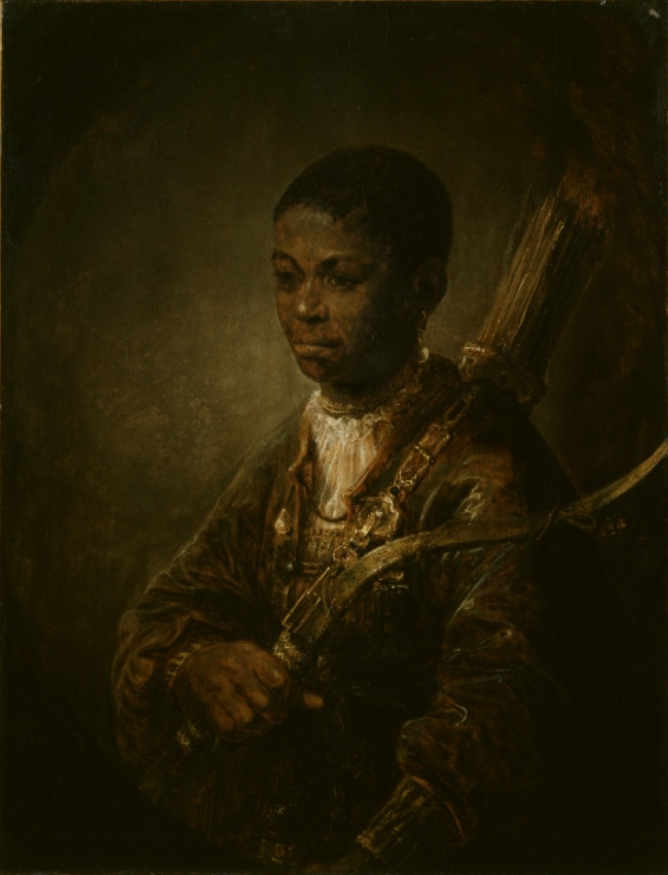
- Artist: Govaert Flinck
- Year: c. 1639–1640
- Medium: Oil on oak panel
- Dimensions: 66.2 cm × 50.8 cm (26.1 in × 20.0 in)
- Location: Wallace Collection

A Young Archer is an oil painting, painted about 1640 by the Dutch Golden Age artist Govaert Flinck. The painting depicts a young black boy dressed as an archer. The painting is in the collection of the Wallace Collection, in London, England.

== Attribution ==
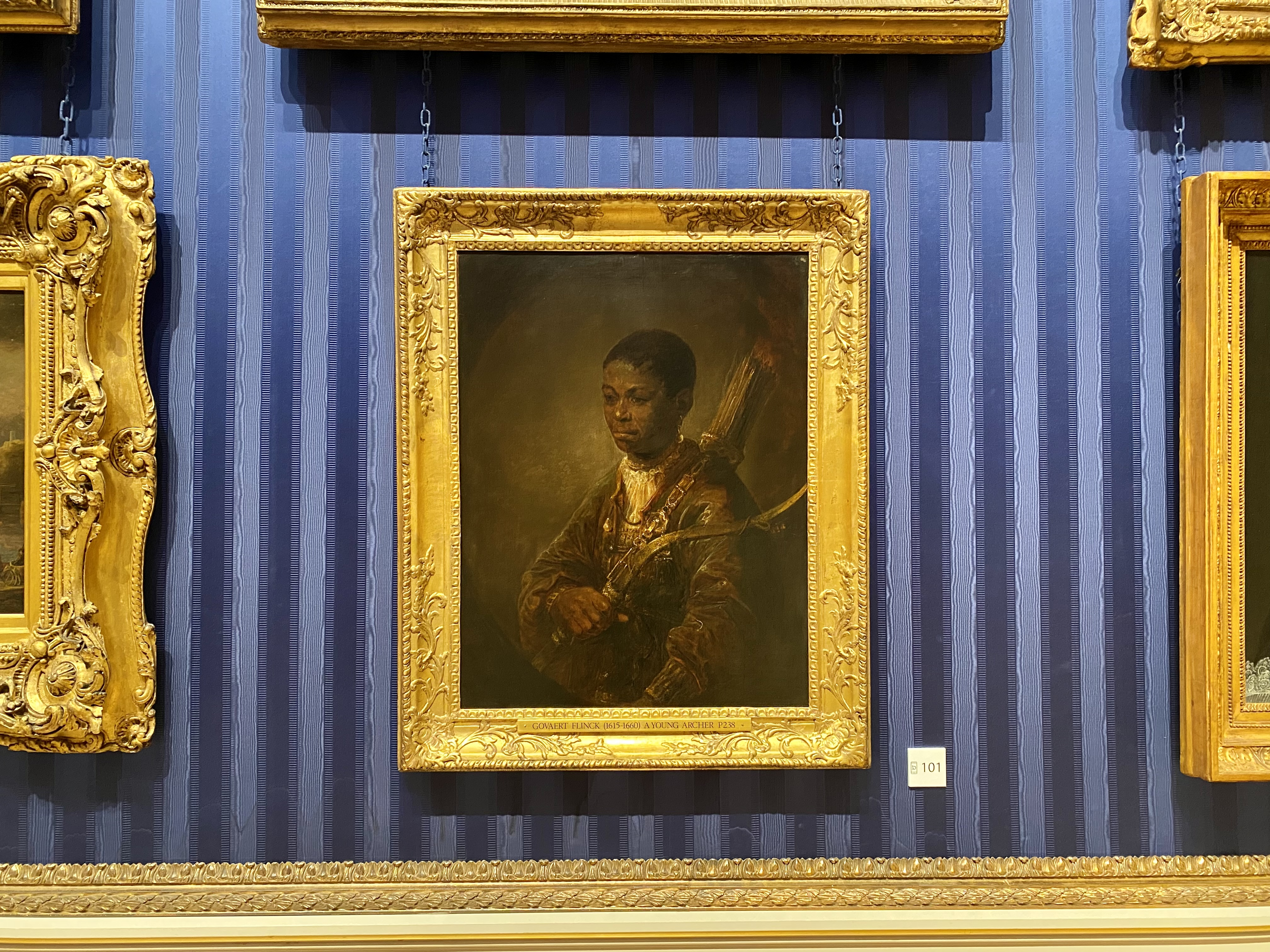
A Young Archer on display at The Wallace Collection

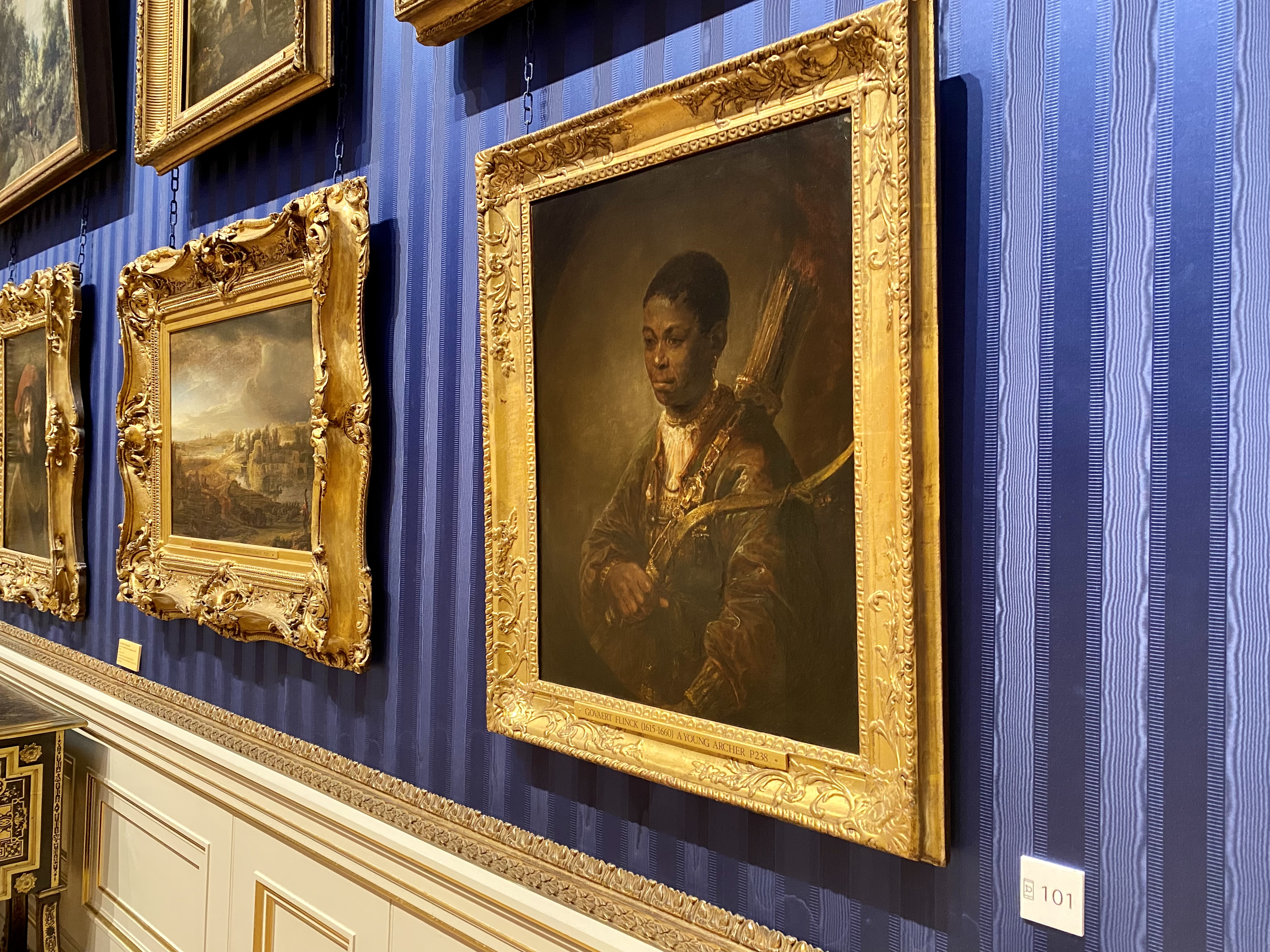

For many years the painting was believed to have been the work of Rembrandt, and was purchased as such by Richard Seymour-Conway, 4th Marquess of Hertford, in 1848. Flinck had studied under Rembrandt in 1631–32, and his style had become so closely associated with him that for many years a self portrait by Flinck in the National Gallery, London, was thought to have been a portrait of Rembrandt. Flinck painted numerous works in the style of Rembrandt when there was a demand for his work in the 1630s and 1640s. The true origin of the painting was discovered after it was cleaned in 1913, and the signature believed to be by Rembrandt turned out to have been falsely added later. A signature beginning with the letter "f" was discovered. The painting had been reattributed to Flinck by 1928.

== Description ==
The style of the painting is known as a "tronie", meaning "a head, a face, or expression". Tronies were not portraits of named people but character studies of exotic figures.

This painting was documented by Hofstede de Groot in 1915, who wrote:

"267. A YOUNG NEGRO ARCHER. Bode 234; Dut. 376; Wb. 253; B.-HdG. 148 -- He stands, turned to the left and looking in that direction. He is about twenty years of age, and has protruding lips and short hair in small curls. He holds a bow at his breast with his right hand. The quiver hangs over his shoulder by a rich gold chain. There are large pearls in his ears and a narrow gold chain round his neck. He has a loose brownish-green coat over a fine pleated shirt, adorned below with a gold chain having large pearls as pendants. Full light falls from the left across the face and on the white shirt. Light grey background. In a painted oval frame. Life size, half-length. Painted about 1634.
Traces of a signature occur below the bow to the right; oak panel, 26 inches by 20 inches.
Mentioned by Dutuit, p.48 ; by Michel, pp. 152, 158 [116, 434] ; [by D. S. MacColl, Burlington Magazine, April 1913, No. cxxi. pp. 36-37, contesting the authenticity].
Exhibited at Bethnal Green Museum, London, 1872, No. 172 ; at the Royal Academy Winter Exhibition, London, 1889, No. 153.
Possibly identical with "A Moor" occurring in the inventory of the effects of the Amsterdam dealer Johannes de Renialme, June 27, 1657, No. 300 (valued at 12 florins) ; see Hofstede de Groot, Urkunden über Rembrandt, No. 177.
Sales—(Possibly), London, 1772 (Ľ5 : 17 : 6, Marquess of Carnarvon).

Duke of Buckingham, Stowe, August 15, 1848, No. 410 (Ľ263 : I I S., S. M. Mawson, for Lord Hertford).

In the collection of the Marquess of Hertford, London.
In the Wallace Collection, London, 1913 catalogue, No. 238."

== Identity of sitter ==
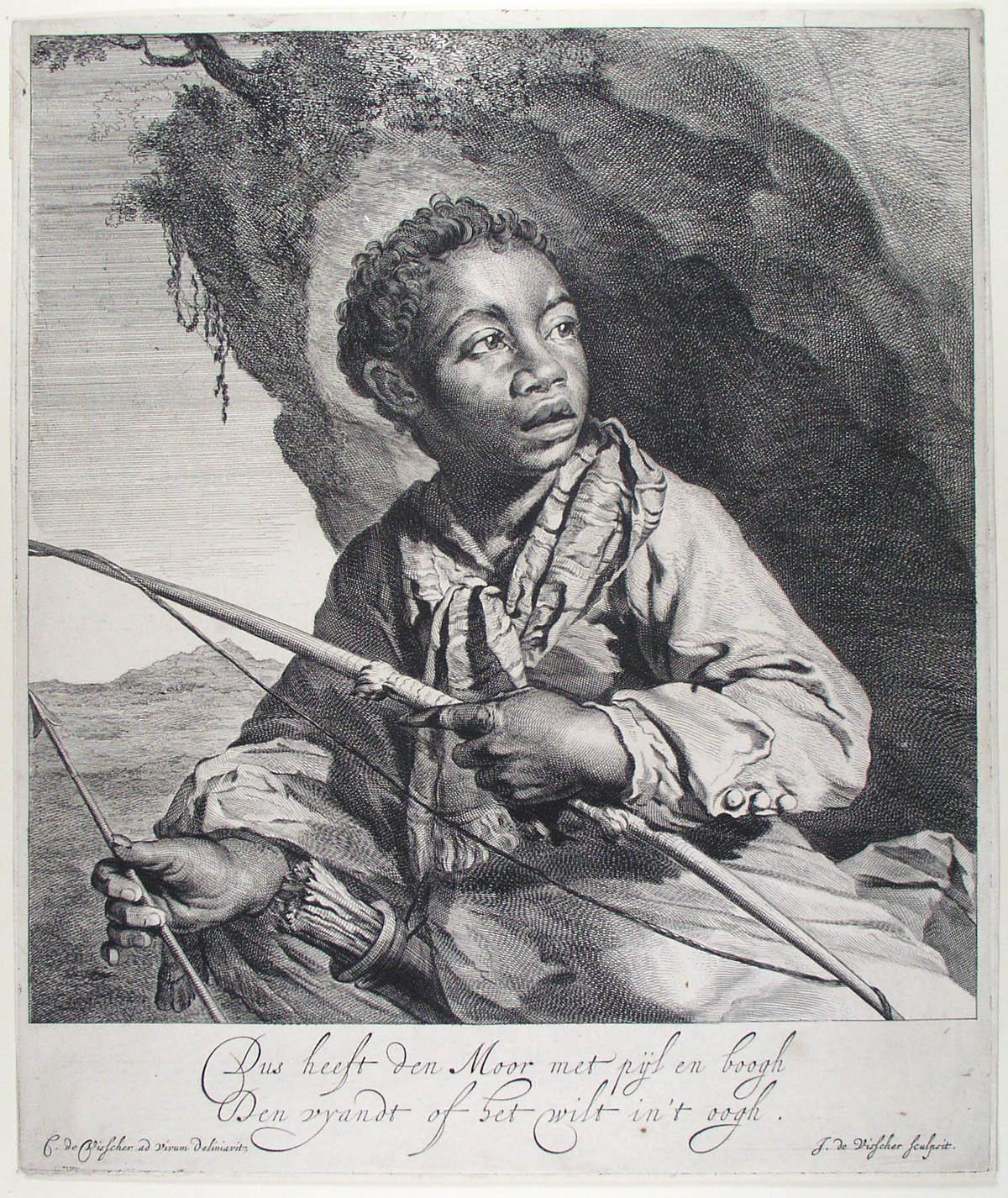
Portrait of a moor with a bow and arrow by Jan de Visscher, c. 1650, after a drawing by Cornelis Visscher which was possibly inspired by the same subject

Two inscriptions for the portrait exist. The first, an engraving by Cornelis Visscher (c.1648) reads:

"Dus heft den Moor met pijl en Boogh / Den vyandt of het wilt in't oogh" (Thus lifts the Moor his bow and arrow / The enemy [or wildlife] to eye)

In the 1750 reproduction of Visscher's portrait, held at the British Museum and published by George Pulley of London, the caption below describes the archer as an American Indian, replacing the word Moor for Indian, the words being interchangeable at the time:

Thus Arm'd, the Indian with his Dart & Bow / Pursues with eager Eye, his Woodland Foe

Rembrandt also portrayed people of African origin, including black soldiers and figures in armour. It is not known whether the boy was a model, in the army, or a huntsman of a Dutch country estate. Art critic Andrew Graham-Dixon wrote of the subject of A Young Archer in 2004 that

Whether the young man painted by Flinck was actually from the Sudan, or not, it seems likely that the painter intended to show him as a living embodiment of the proud, martial spirit of the Nubian race – a poignant contrast to his actual situation, as a first-generation African slave...The solemn, thoughtful humanity of Flinck's portrayal makes it unusual, among early Western European depictions of black Africans, suggesting at the very least a bond between the artist and the sitter.

The 1750 reproduction of Visscher's portrait, published by George Pulley of London, describes the subject as an Indian, presumably of American origin.
