= Hendrick Fromantiou =

Dutch still life painter

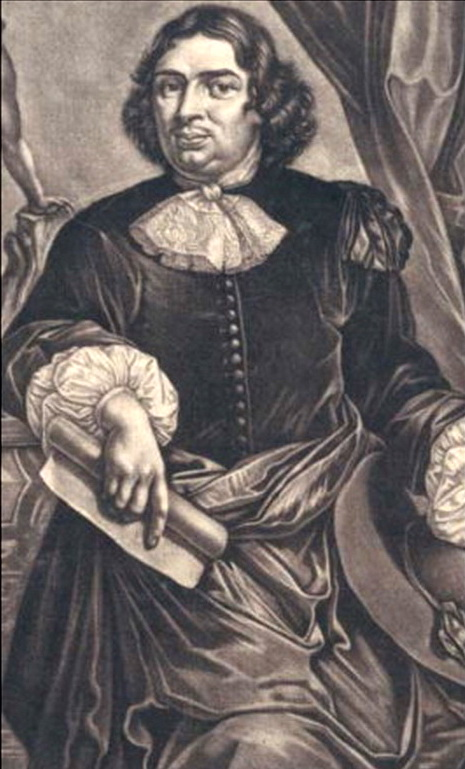
Portrait of de Fromantiou by anonymous

Hendrik de Fromantiou (1633 – after 1693) was a Dutch still life painter.

== Early life ==
Fromantiou was born in Maastricht. In his youth, he produced works for the art dealer Gerrit van Uylenburgh in Amsterdam and from 1658, he was active in The Hague.

== Career ==
In 1670, he was appointed as conservator of the royal collection in Potsdam. In 1671, when Van Uylenburgh tried to sell 13 paintings to Frederick William, Elector of Brandenburg, Fromantiou successfully advised the Elector to send 12 pieces back as forgeries. Fromantiou claimed the paintings were copies of Italian ones, and he could point out the originals in Holland. Included in the 51 people involved in the expertise, was Johannes Vermeer.

== Personal life ==
In 1672 he married the daughter of the rich and successful fellow Dutch painter Philip Wouwerman. He died in Potsdam.

== Gallery ==
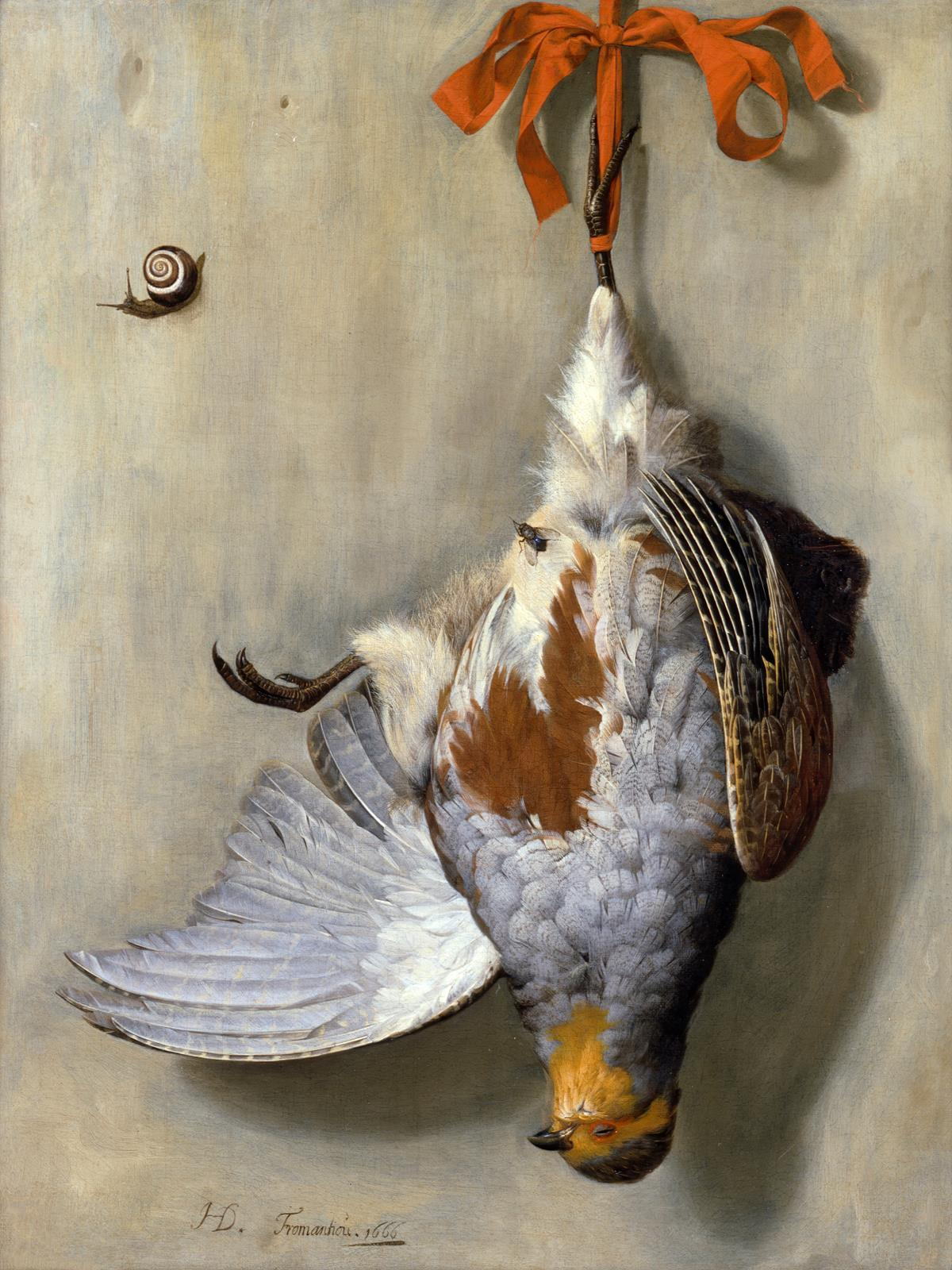
Trompe l'oeil with Dead Fowl, 1666

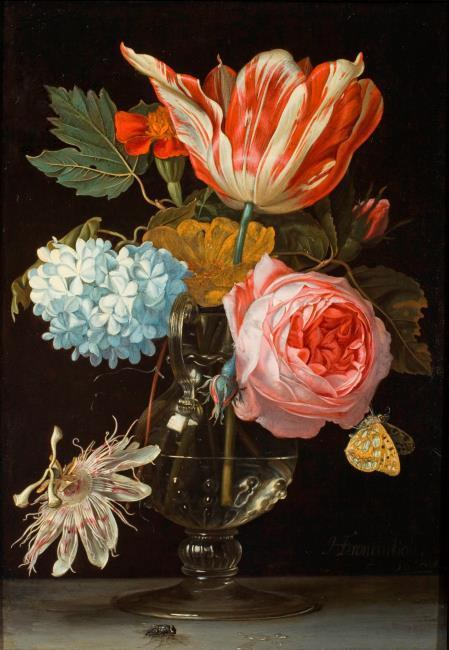
Flowers in a Vase with a Passion Flower, 1668

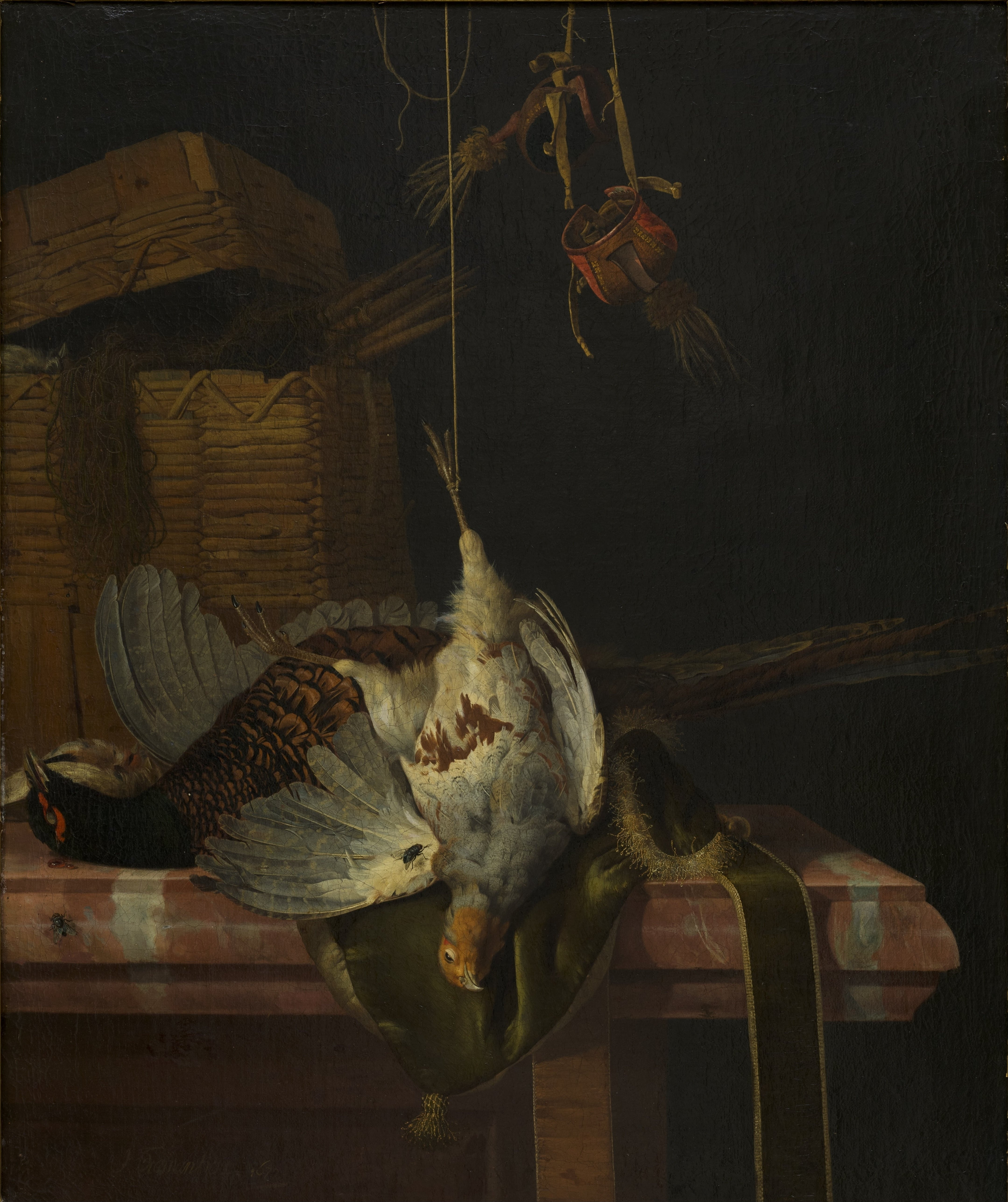
Hunting Still Life, 1672

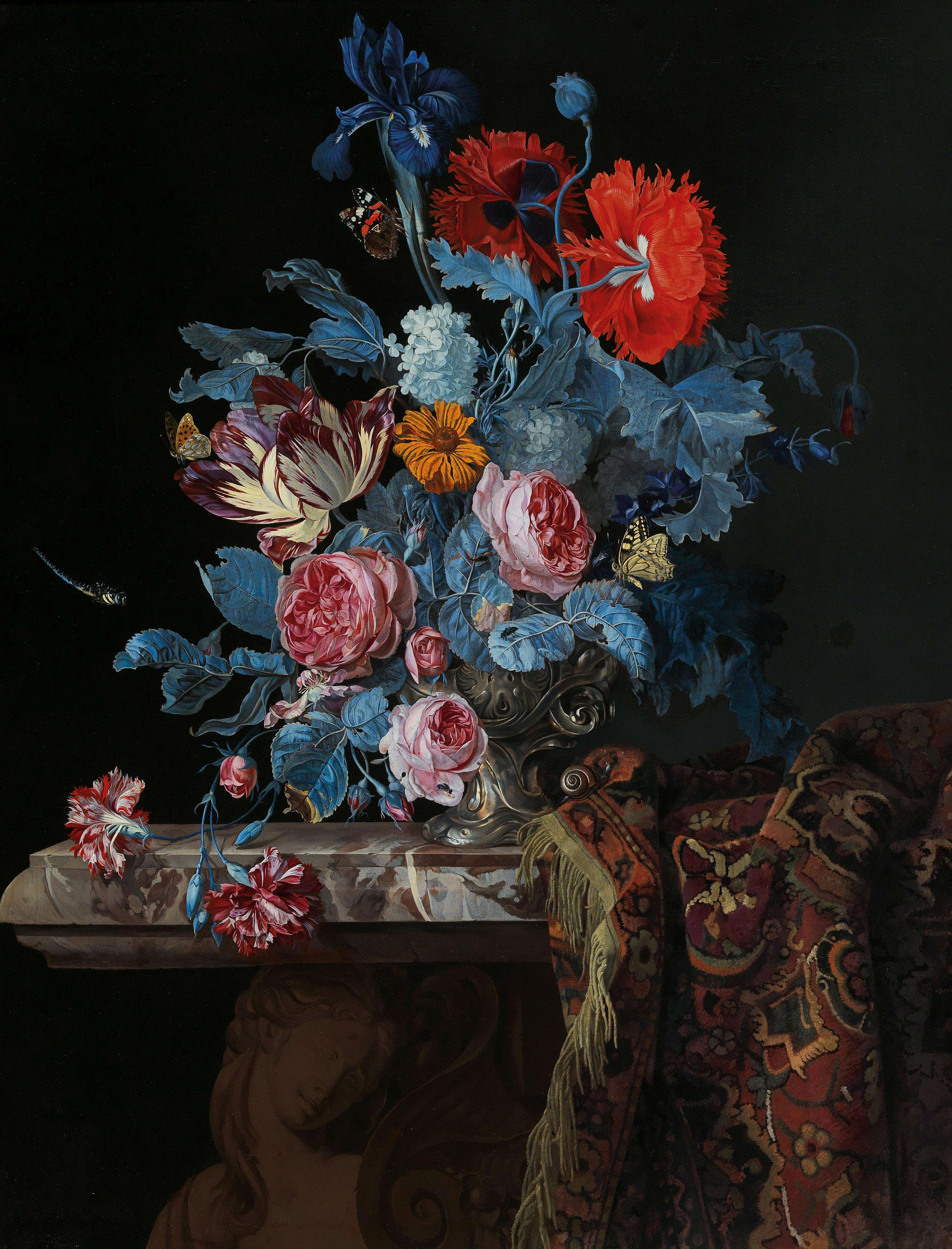
A Still Life with Flowers in a Silver Vase and a Folded Rug

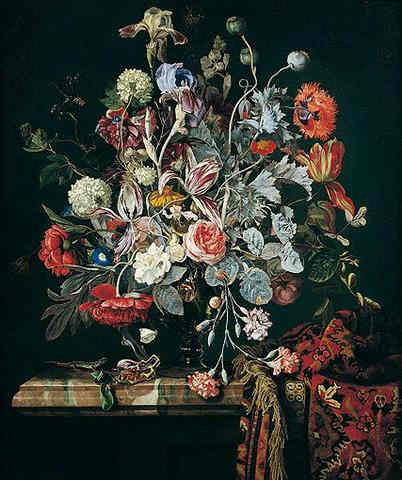
A Still Life of Flowers in a Glass Vase on a Marble Ledge Partly Draped with a Carpet

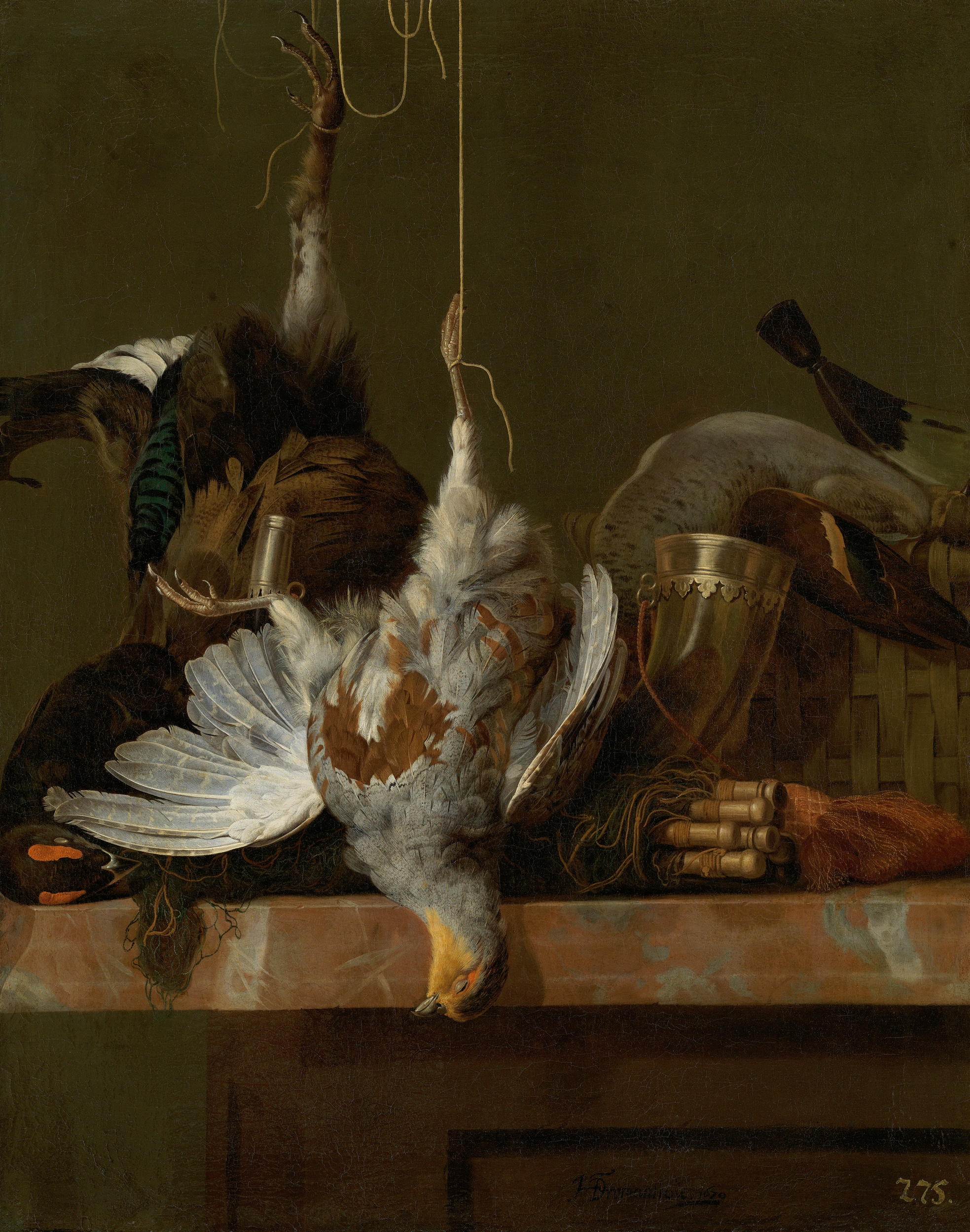
A Still Life with Dead Partridge, Pheasant, and Hunting Gear, 1670

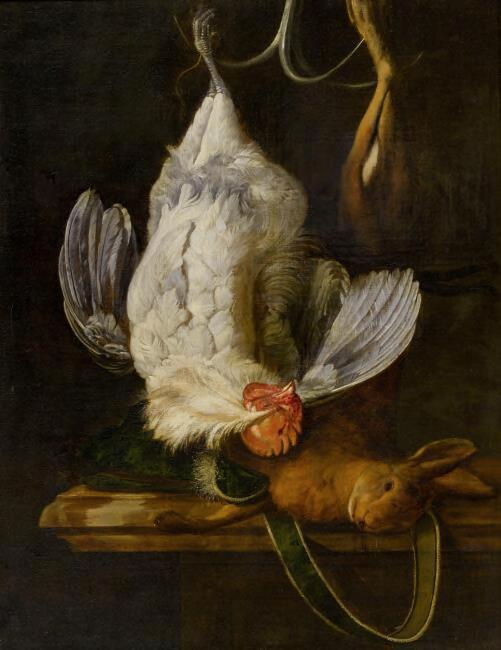
Still Life with a White Rooster and a Hare (between 1642 and 1693)
