= Rombertus van Uylenburgh =

Dutch lawyer (1554–1624)

Rombertus van Uylenburgh or Rombout van Uylenborgh (1554 – 4 June 1624) is best known as the father of Saskia van Uylenburgh, the wife of Rembrandt. Rombertus was one of the founders of the University of Franeker in 1585. Gerrit van Uylenburgh, who may have been Rombertus' brother, was a Mennonite and left for Poland to become the royal furniture maker in Kraków, and became the father of the art dealer Hendrick van Uylenburgh.

== Life ==
Rombertus was born in Bergum. He studied law at the Catholic University of Leuven or at Heidelberg and graduated in 1578. In this same year, he became a lawyer in Leeuwarden. He married Siuckien Ulckedr Aessinga (or Sjoukje Osinga) and probably had three sons and four daughters: Jeltje, Romke, Ulke, Antje, Edzert, Hiskje (= Hiskia) and Saakje (= Saskia). With a career constantly on the rise, he became a pensionaris and mayor of Leeuwarden. He was also chosen in 1584 as a delegate of the states of Friesland and one of the Frisian envoys in the Hague. Because votes were per region, the number of delegates made no difference.

Van Uylenburgh was present at Delft on the day of the murder of prince William of Orange — 10 July 1584 — for discussions with the prince over difficulties in the Frisian States. Rombertus, embarrassed, was invited to the lunch because there were no other guests. At the end of the meal, William of Orange stumbled on the stairs and was then murdered with a pistol by Balthasar Gerards. Cornelis van Aarsens — according to Uylenburgh, not present at the event — jotted down the prince's last words. The bishop Morillon wrote "Je le tiens mentir de ce qu' auroit dit ledict Orangier estant féru, puisqu' il advint après boire, lorsqu' il estoit tousiours raoust."

Until 1591 Uylenburgh rose as a state lawyer (landsadvocaat), but was forced — because of the variety of positions he held — to give up that post. In his later legal career he became the supreme-court lawyer (raadsheer) at the Court of Friesland. In 1595 he bought a house on the Ossekop, where Saskia was born. (Today the building is in use by the famous twins and lawyers Wim and Hans Anker.) Van Uylenburgh owned two farms, one in Rijperkerk, the other in Gaasterland. Two sons became lawyers, one son-in-law was the Polish theological professor Johannes Maccovius, and the other was Gerrit van Loo, municipal secretary in Het Bildt, the place where Rembrandt and Saskia married in 1634. Uylenburgh died at Leeuwarden.

== Bibliography ==
- Graaff, A. & M. Roscam Abbing (2006) Rembrandt voor Dummies. Addison Wesley.
- Mak, G. (1996) Ooggetuigen van de vaderlandse geschiedenis. Meer dan honderd reportages uit Nederland, p. 70-1.
