= Govert Flinck =

Dutch painter (1615–1660)

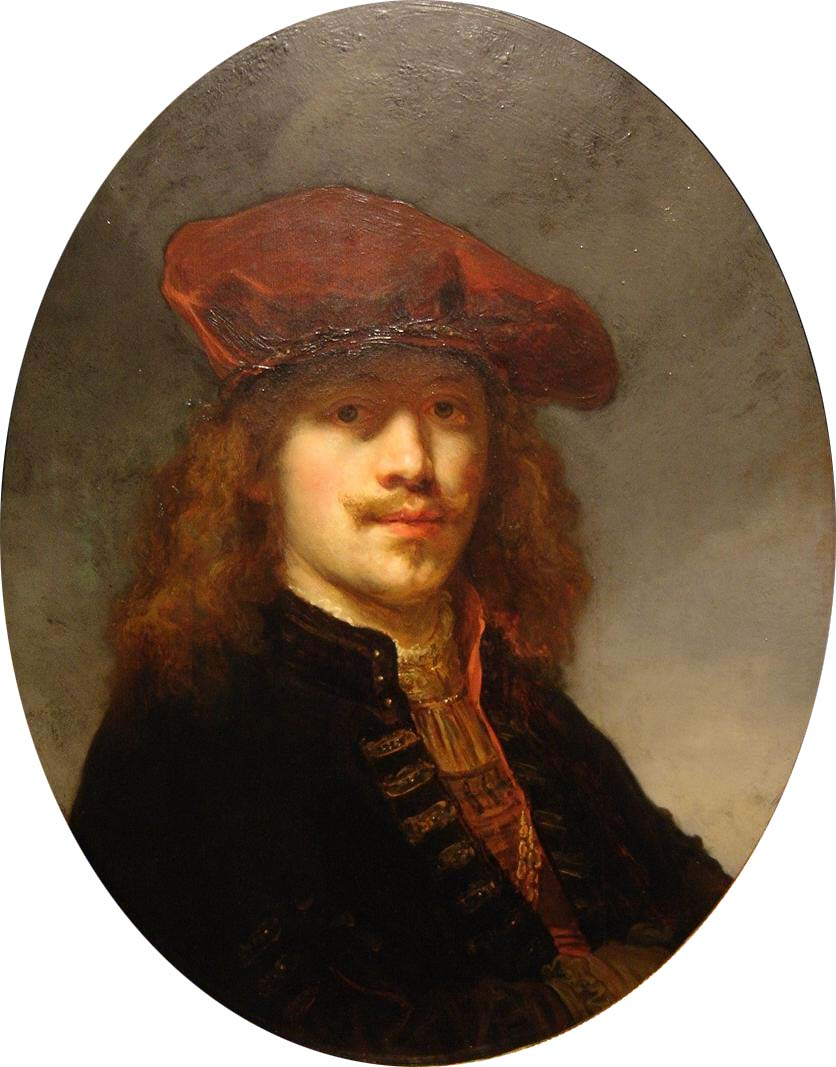
- Self-portrait, circa 1640, Oil on panel, 66 × 51.4 cm, Kelvingrove Art Gallery and Museum, Glasgow, Scotland
- Born: 25 January 1615; Kleve, Dutch Republic
- Died: 2 February 1660 (aged 45); Amsterdam, Dutch Republic
- Education: Rembrandt van Rijn
- Known for: Painting
- Movement: Dutch Golden Age; Baroque

Govert (or Govaert) Teuniszoon Flinck (25 January 1615 – 2 February 1660) was a Dutch painter of the Dutch Golden Age.

== Life ==
Born at Kleve, capital of the Duchy of Cleves, which was occupied at the time by the United Provinces, he was apprenticed by his father to a silk mercer, but having secretly acquired a passion for etching and drawing, was sent to Leeuwarden, where he boarded in the house of Lambert Jacobszoon, a Mennonite, better known as an itinerant preacher than as a painter.

Here Flinck was joined by Jacob Backer, and the companionship of a youth determined like himself to be an artist only confirmed his passion for painting. Amongst the neighbours of Jacobszon at Leeuwarden were the sons and relations of Rombertus van Uylenburgh, whose daughter Saskia married Rembrandt in 1634. Other members of the same family lived in Amsterdam, cultivating the arts either professionally or as amateurs. The pupils of Lambert probably gained some knowledge of Rembrandt by intercourse with the Ulenburgs. Certainly Joachim von Sandrart, who visited Holland in 1637, found Flinck acknowledged as one of Rembrandt's best pupils, and living habitually in the house of the dealer Hendrick van Uylenburgh at Amsterdam.

For many years Flinck laboured on the lines of Rembrandt, following that master's style in all the works which he executed between 1636 and 1648. It was after his time with Rembrandt that he took up the material of blue paper for drawings with his colleagues Jacob Backer and Jacob van Loo. With aspirations as a history painter, however, he looked to the swelling forms and grand action of Peter Paul Rubens, which led to many commissions for official and diplomatic painting. Flinck's relations with Cleves became in time very important. He was introduced to the court of the Great Elector, Friedrich Wilhelm I of Brandenburg, who possessed the Duchy and who married in 1646 Louisa of Orange. He obtained the patronage of John Maurice of Nassau, who was made Stadtholder of Cleves in 1649.

In 1652 a citizen of Amsterdam, Flinck married in 1656 an heiress, Sophie van der Houven, daughter of a director of the Dutch East India Company. Flinck was already well known in the patrician circles over which the brothers Cornelis and Andries de Graeff and the alderman Jan Six presided; he was on terms of intimacy with the poet Joost van den Vondel and the treasurer Johannes Uitenbogaard. In his house, adorned with casts after the Antique, costumes, and a noble collection of prints, he often received the stadtholder John Maurice, whose portrait is still preserved in the work of the learned Caspar Barlaeus. Flinck died in Amsterdam on 2 February 1660 at the age of 45.

== Works ==
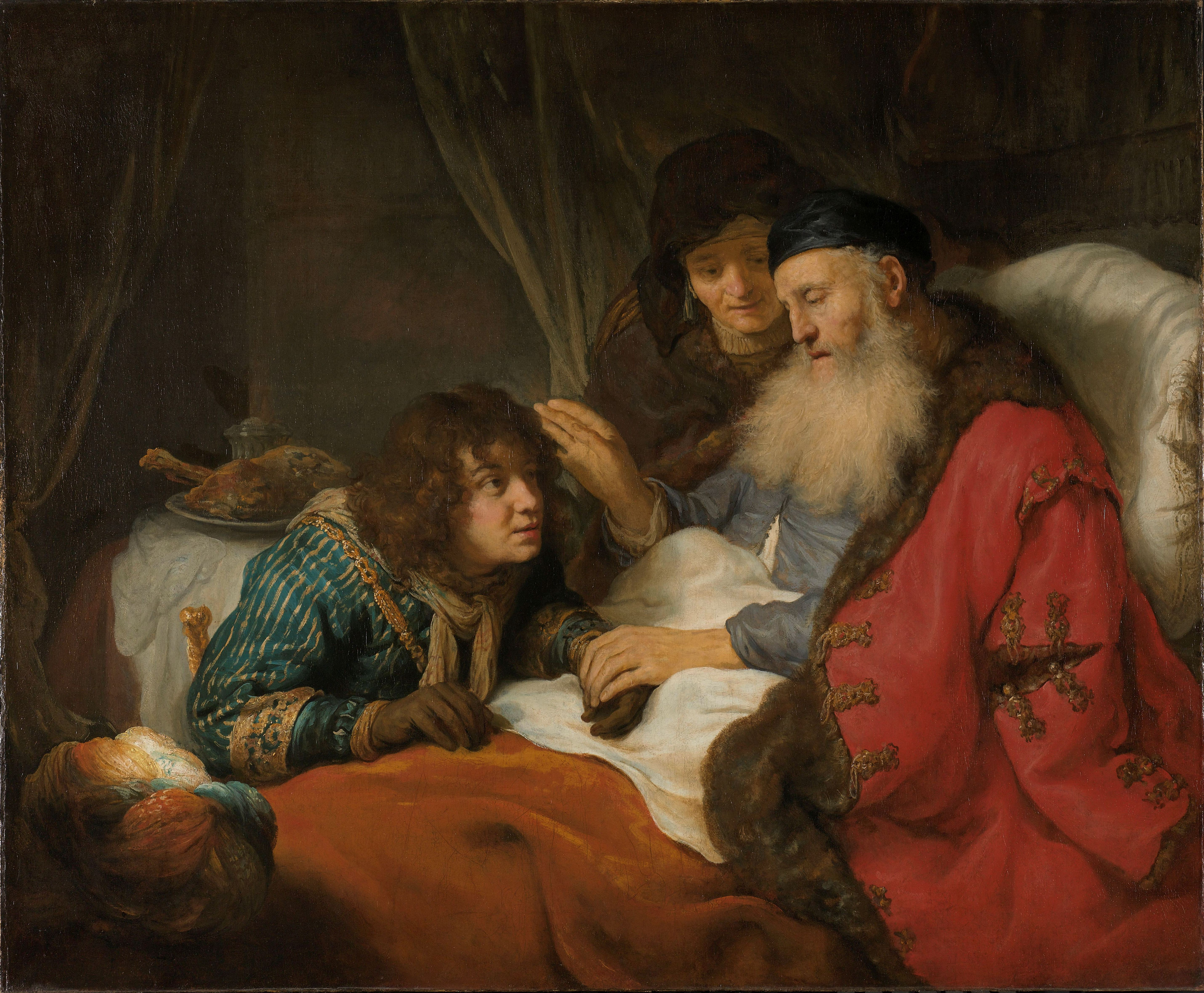
Blessing of Jacob (1638)

The chronology of Flinck's works, so far as they are seen in public galleries, comprises, in addition to the foregoing, the Grey Beard of 1639 at Dresden, A Young Archer from 1640 in the Wallace Collection, the Girl of 1641 at the Louvre, a portrait group of a male and female (1646) in Rotterdam, and a lady (1651) in Berlin.

In November 1659 the burgomaster of Amsterdam contracted with Flinck for 12 canvases to represent four heroic figures of David and Samson and Manius Curius Dentatus and Horatius Cocles, and scenes from the Batavians and Romans. Flinck was unable to finish more than the sketches. After his death Rembrandt was asked to fill one of the commissions, and produced his last great history picture, The Conspiracy of Claudius Civilis, which the authorities rejected.

In the same year he received a flattering acknowledgment from the town council of Cleves and the completion of a picture of Solomon which was a counterpart of the composition at Amsterdam. This and other pictures and portraits, such as those of Friedrich Wilhelm and John Maurice, and the allegory of Louisa of Orange attended by Victory and Fame and other figures at the cradle of the first-born son of the elector, have disappeared. Of several pictures which were painted for the Great Elector, none are preserved except the Expulsion of Hagar in the Berlin museum.

== Gallery ==
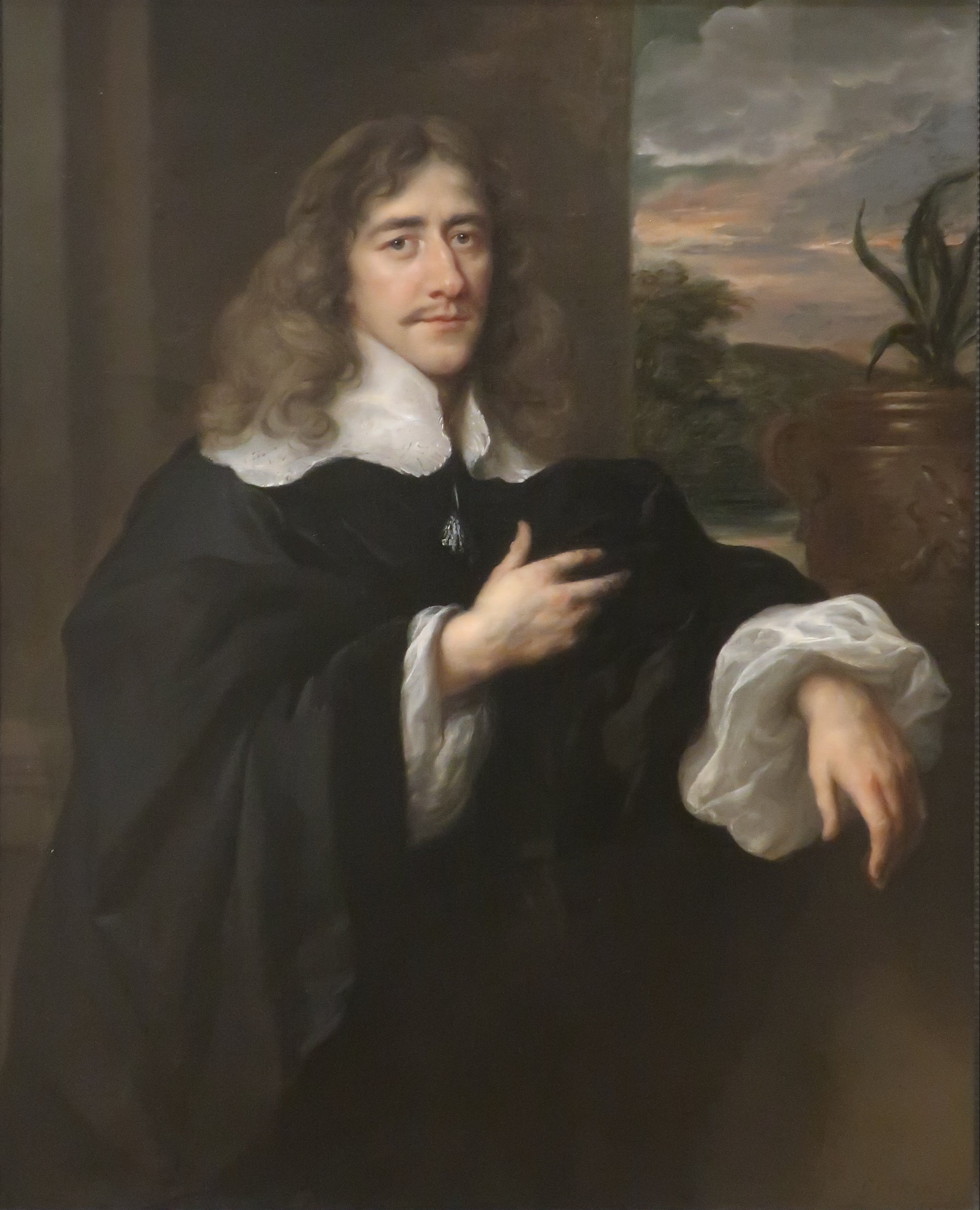
Portrait of Pieter de Graeff

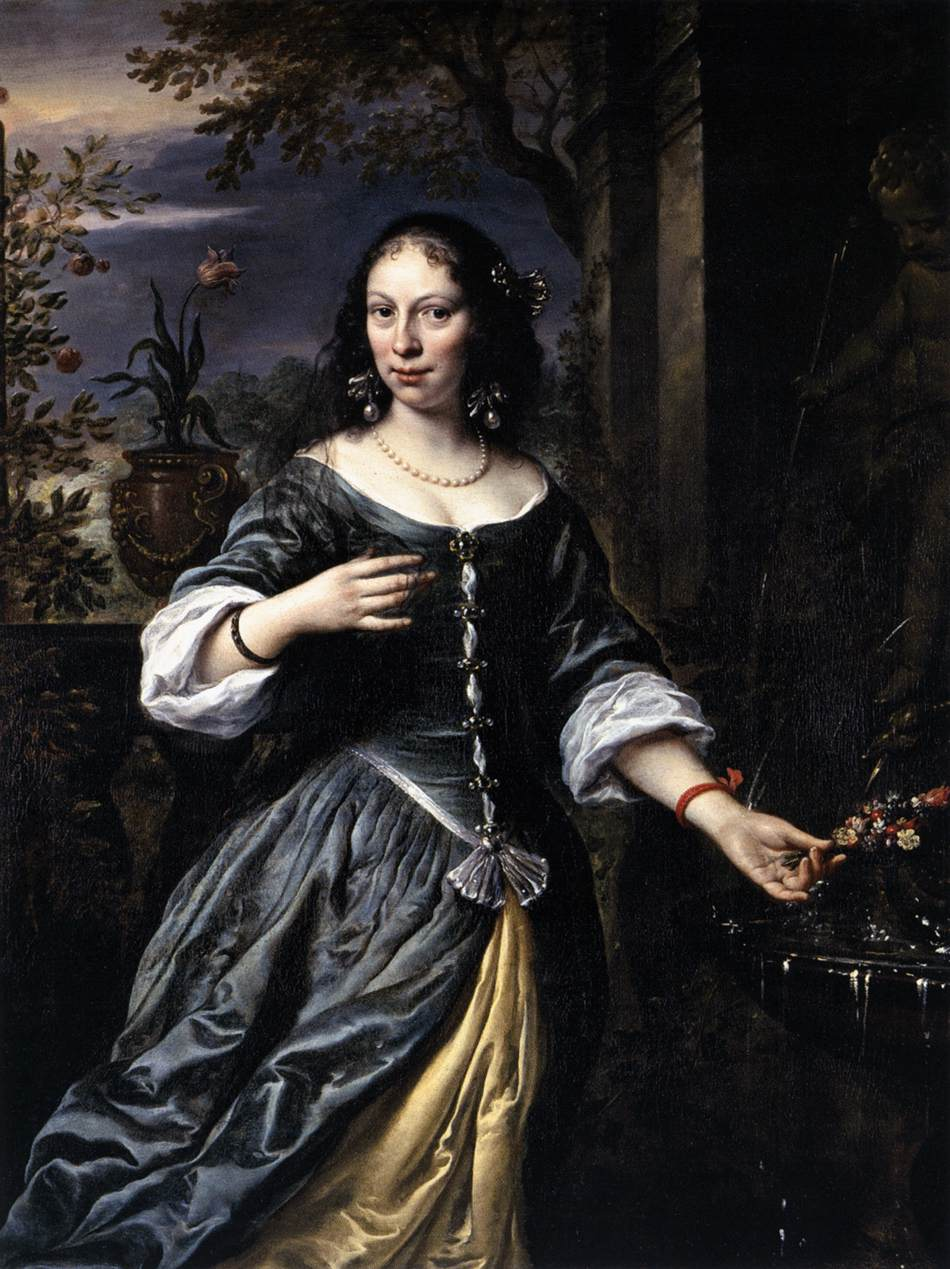
Portrait of Susanna van Baerle (1655)

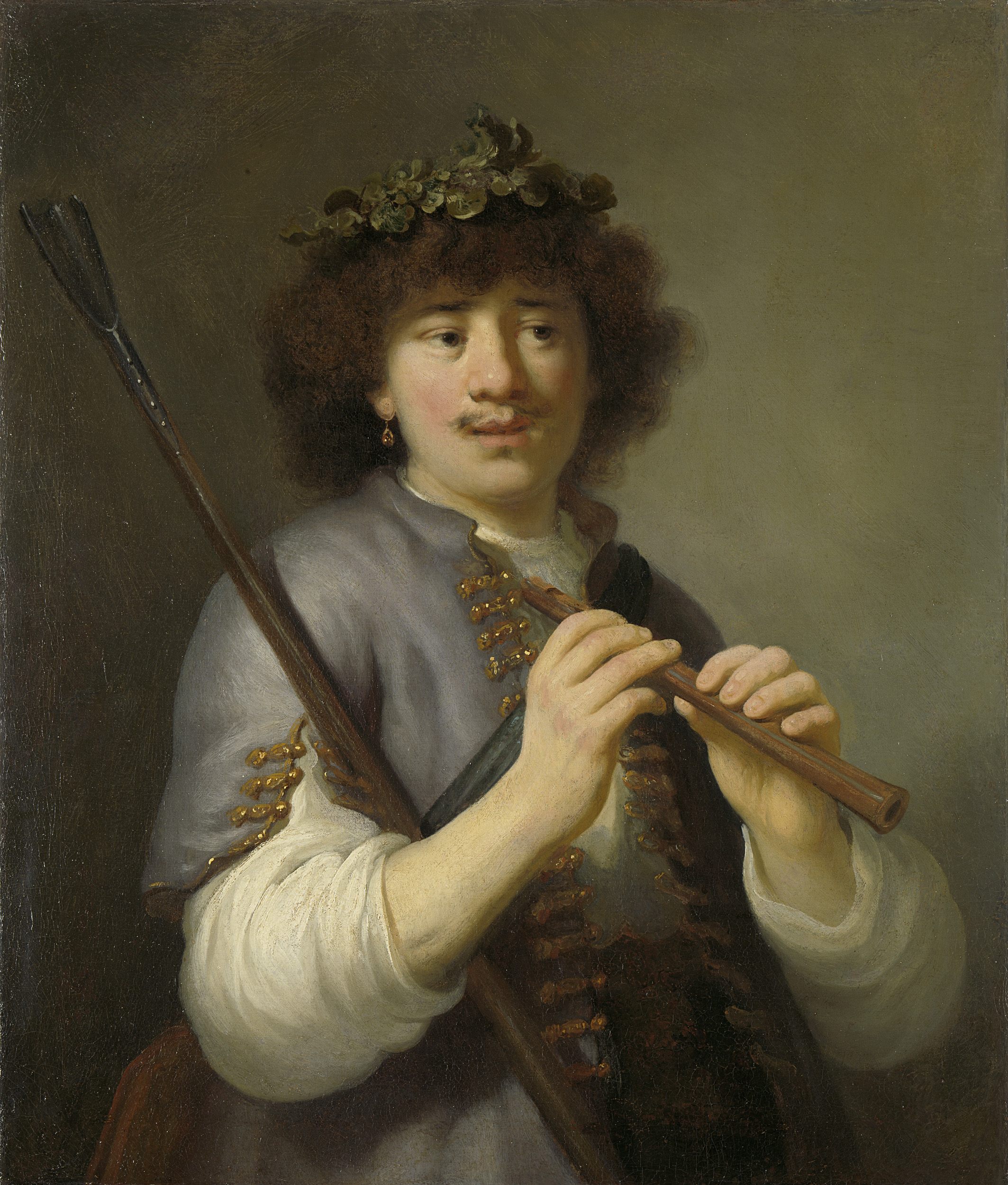
Rembrandt as shepherd with staff and flute

Landscape with Obelisk. Historically mistaken as being by Rembrandt. It was stolen in 1990 from the Isabella Stewart Gardner Museum. Boston.

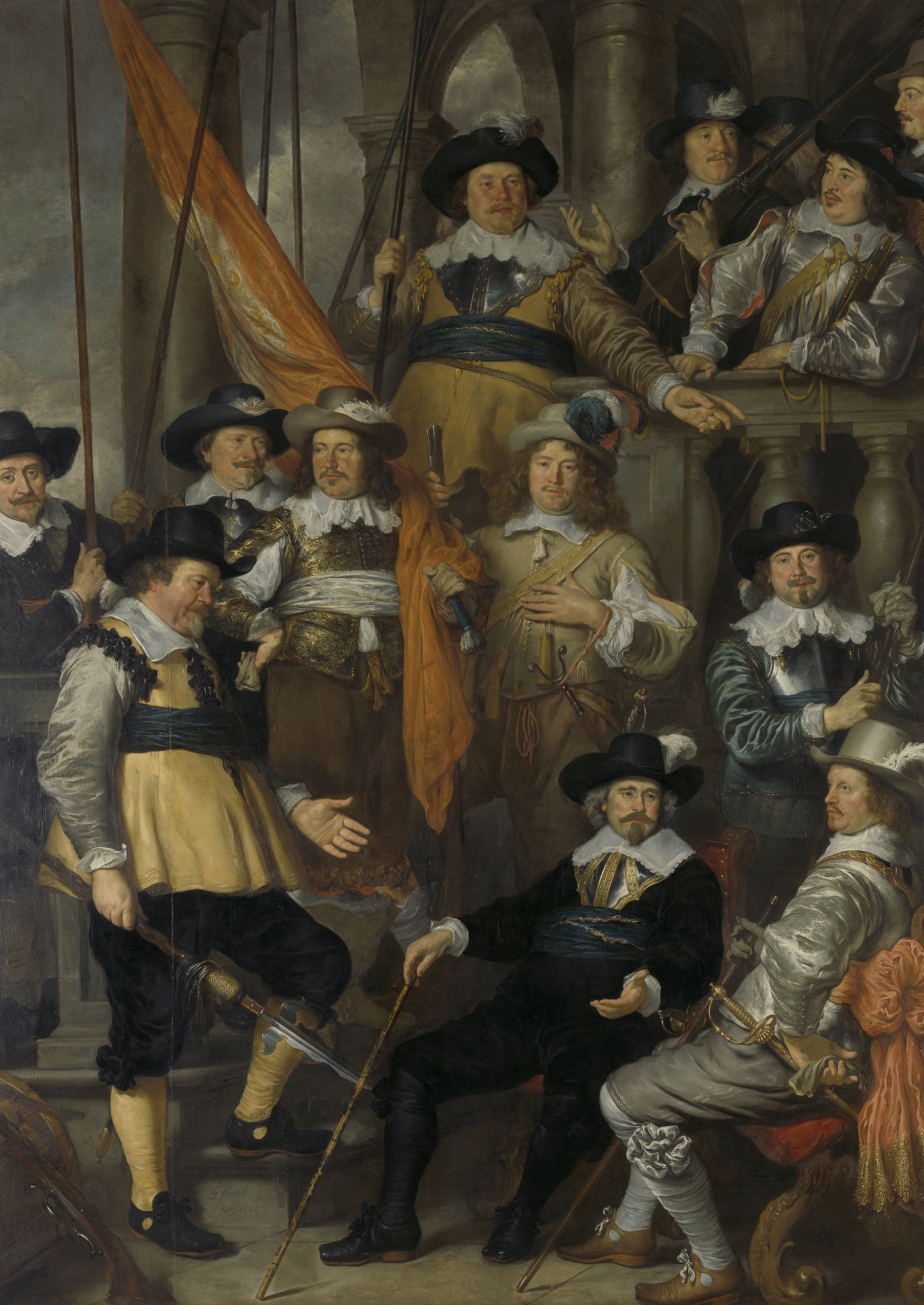
Militia Company of District XVIII under the Command of Captain Albert Bas (1645) (Rijksmuseum, Amsterdam)

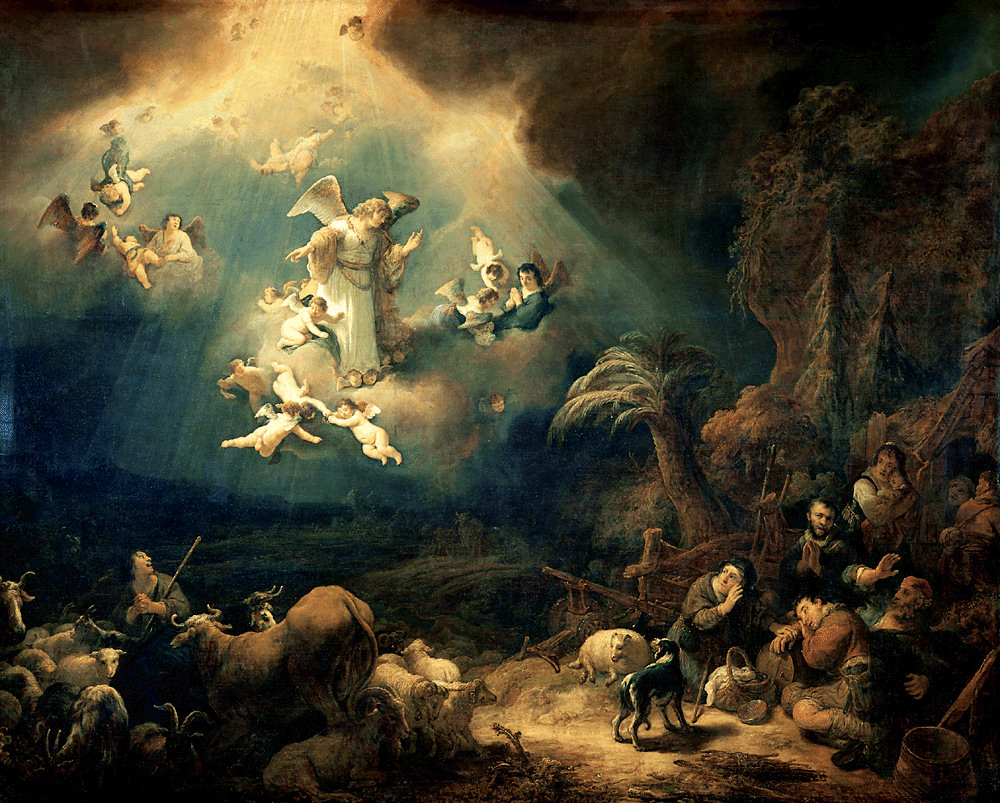
Angels announcing the birth of Christ to the shepherds (1639), Louvre

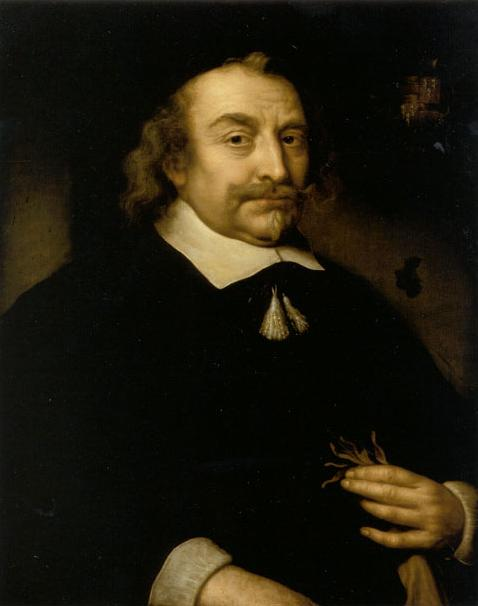
Portrait of Cornelis Bicker (1654)

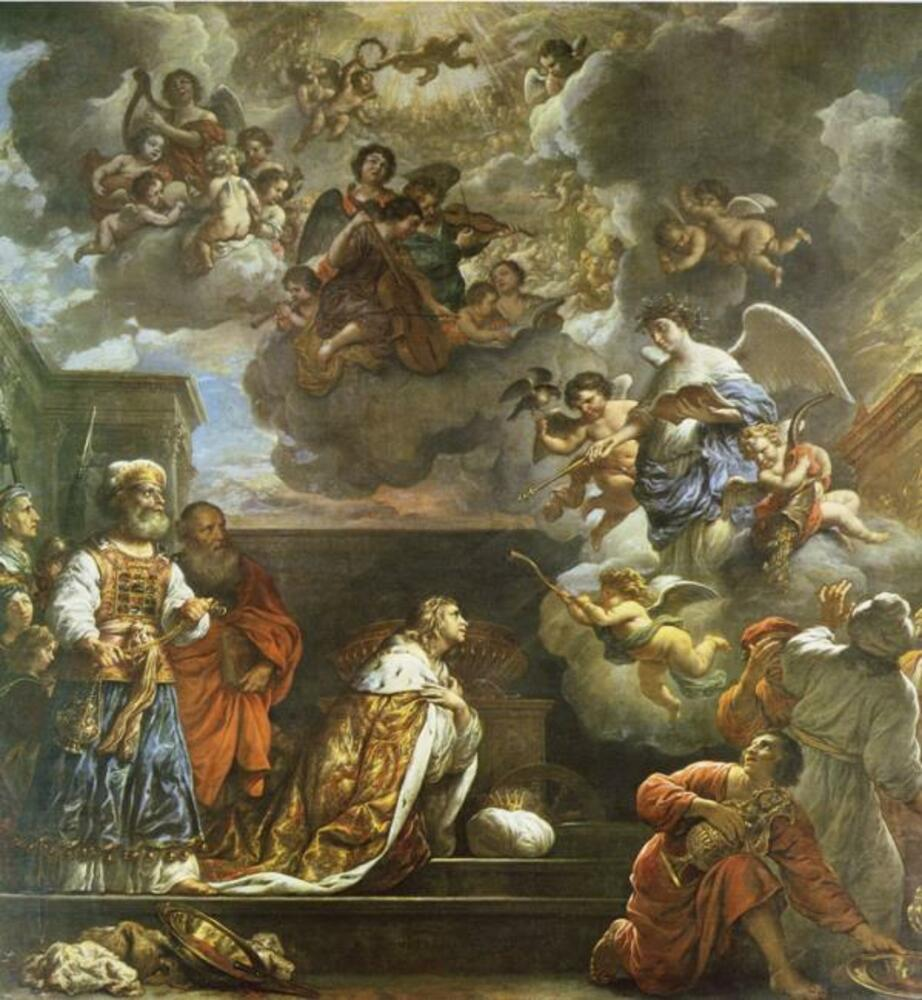
Solomon prays for wisdom, in the Royal Palace of Amsterdam
