= Hendrick van Uylenburgh =

Dutch art dealer

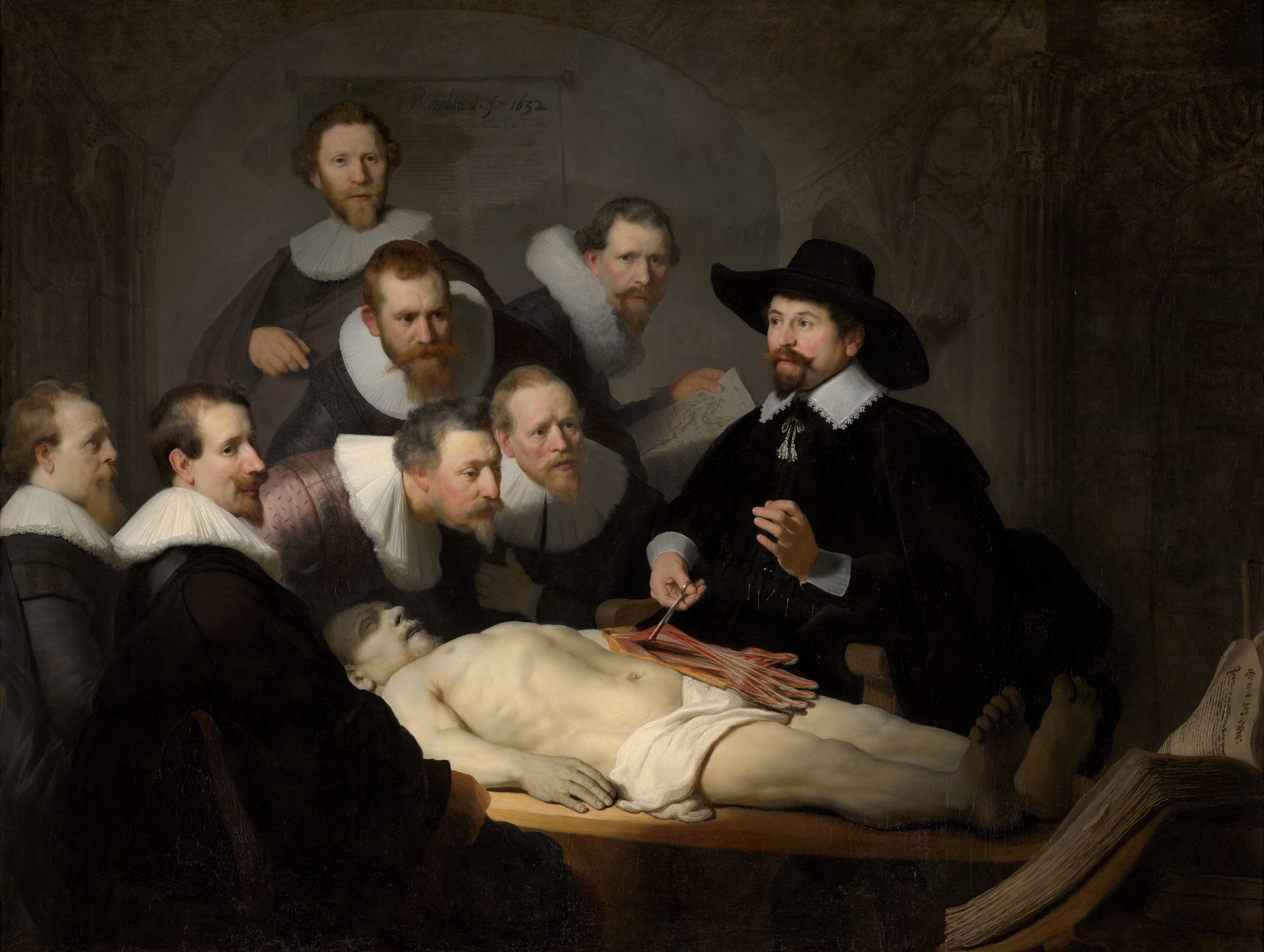
The Anatomy Lesson of Dr. Nicolaes Tulp (1632), painted by Rembrandt while at Hendrick van Uylenburgh's studio

Hendrick Gerritszoon van Uylenburgh (c. 1587 – 1661) was an influential Dutch Golden Age art dealer who helped launch the careers of Rembrandt, Govert Flinck, Ferdinand Bol and other painters.

== Biography ==
Van Uylenburgh came from a Frisian family and emigrated with this family to Kraków (Poland) when he was a boy. He was trained as a painter and also worked as an art buyer for the Polish king. Around 1612 he moved to Danzig (now Gdańsk) and in 1625 returned to the Netherlands, settling in the bustling capital of Amsterdam.

Van Uylenburgh took over the business of Cornelis van der Voort and became an art dealer, employing painters in his own studio. In 1631 Rembrandt moved into van Uylenburgh's house (adjacent to Rembrandt's later home, now the Rembrandt House Museum) to work in Van Uylenburgh's studio. Rembrandt became chief painter of the studio and in 1634 married Van Uylenburgh's first cousin Saskia van Uylenburgh.

In 1637 he rented a house called "Kronenborg", formerly owned by Pieter Isaacsz. In 1647 Van Uylenburgh had to move to a new location on Dam square. When his house on Dam square was appropriated to build a new city hall (now the Royal Palace), Van Uylenburgh relocated to Westermarkt square.

His son Gerrit van Uylenburgh took over the family business after Van Uylenburgh's death and burial in the Westerkerk church in 1661. Gerrit went bankrupt in 1675 following accusations that he had sold forged art to Frederick William, Elector of Brandenburg.

== Posterity ==
In 2006 the Rembrandt House Museum presented an exhibition around Hendrick van Uylenburgh and his son Gerrit. The exhibition was also shown at the Dulwich Picture Gallery in London.
