= Svindersvik =

1740s county house in Sweden

Coordinates: 59°18′36″N 18°07′48″E

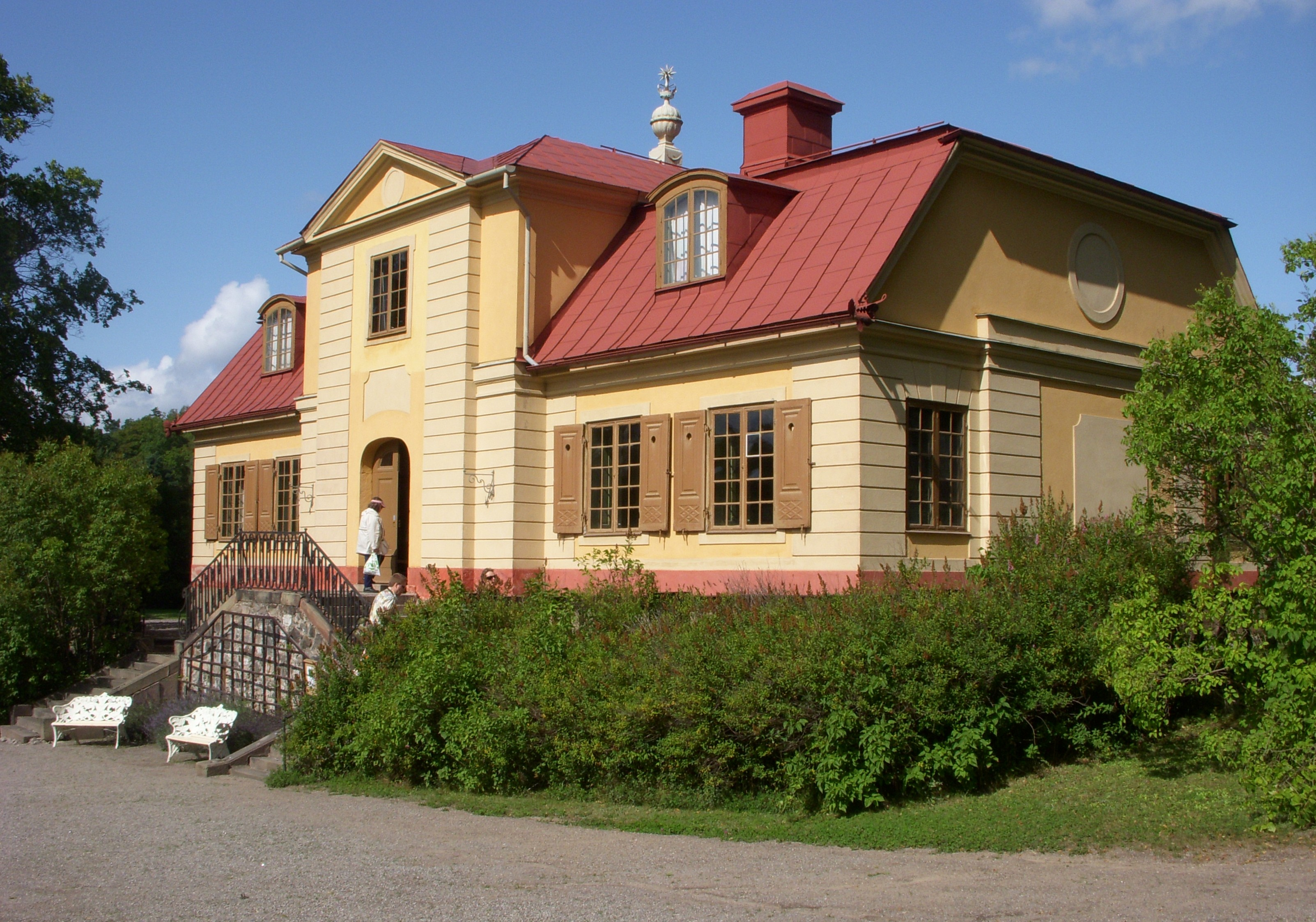
Svindersvik, the main building

Svindersvik is a well-preserved 18th century country residence in Nacka Municipality, Sweden. Svindersvik lies just outside the city limits of Stockholm. It was built in the 1740s for Claes Grill, and today belongs to the Nordic Museum. It is open to the public through guided tours.

== History ==
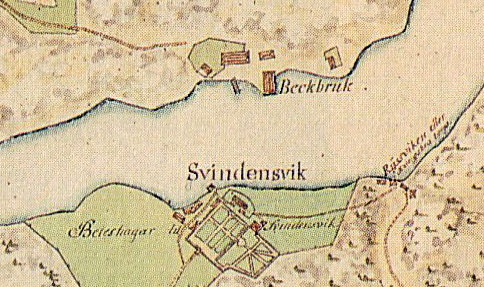
Map of Svindersvik from 1774

Svindersvik derives its name from Johan van Swinderen, a Dutch industrialist who was the first owner of the area; he erected a number of pitch factories in the vicinity in the 1640s. The whole area was bought in 1721 by the brothers Abraham and Carl (Carlos) Grill, members of the Grill family of industrialists. It passed through inheritance to Claes Grill (I), active in the Swedish East India Company in 1736, and it was he who decided to build a country residence on the location. From the outset, it was designed as a country residence and not a permanent home. In this capacity, it is unique for its time and one of the oldest preserved residences in Sweden of this kind.

Claes Grill commissioned architect Carl Hårleman to design the house. Hårleman created a Rococo edifice with inspiration from contemporary French architecture, and in a similar style to Svartsjö Palace, also by Hårleman. Construction started in the 1740s, but was probably not finished by the time of Claes Grill's death in 1767. The terrace, for example, was added sometime between 1748-49 and 1784, as can be deduced from comparing two paintings of Svindersvik from these different dates. After the death of Claes Grill, it passed to his daughter Anna Johanna and her husband, Henric Wilhelm Peill. They sold it in 1780 to Catharina Charlotta Ribbing, the widow of Charles De Geer, one of the richest men in Sweden. She was a close friend of the king, Gustav III of Sweden, who visited Svindersvik several times. She ordered the construction or substantial expansion of an additional pavilion by the water, intended as a place for festivities.

When she died in 1787, Svindersvik passed to her youngest son Louis, who sold it in 1791. It then successively passed between a number of different owners until 1949, when it was bought by the Nordic Museum.

== Architecture ==
Svindersvik is a small ensemble consisting of a number of buildings. Apart from the main building and the aforementioned pavilion, there is a kitchen wing, a formal garden and an orchard.

The design of the main building is very clearly derived from contemporary French Rococo architecture, and its layout is very similar to designs for country residences published by Charles Étienne Briseux; indeed, it has been suggested that the original floor plan may have been identical to one of Briseux' designs, published in 1743.

From the exterior the main building appears to be a one-storey house, although it is a two-storey house (a similar design was adopted by Hårleman for Svartsjö Palace). The entrance is reached by a flight of double stairs, and set in the centre of the façade which protrudes in the way of an avant-corps with rusticated lesenes and pediment. On the opposite side, facing the Baltic Sea, a three-sided avant-corps instead serves to mark the symmetrical centre of the building.

The layout of the floor plan is very symmetrical, in accordance with Rococo ideals. The entrance leads to a hall that occupies both storeys and is crowned by a roof lantern supplying light. The central part of the building houses the dining room; to the left of this is an antechamber and to the right the so-called parade bedroom. The interior decoration is largely intact or, in a few cases, restored with 18th century furniture. The dining room is decorated in a strict form of classicism with pilasters and painted festoons, executed in grisaille technique. The furnishings are however simple. The antechamber is more pronouncedly Rococo in character, with exotic, Chinese wallpapers, a testimony of Claes Grill's work at the Swedish East India Company. The furnishings are here also richer. The parade bedroom is to a certain degree a reconstruction, with furniture from the time. Here also the wallpaper is Chinese.

On the second floor, there is an intact 18th century billiards room. The kitchen in the wing to the main building has unusually also remained almost completely unchanged since the 18th century.

The pavilion contains a set of interior of slightly later date, from the time of king Gustav III. It contains, among other things, a cocklestove which is probably the tallest in Sweden (4.65 metres (15.3 ft)). The walls of the main room of the pavilion are decoratively painted with Ionic pilasters between which are decorative elements depicting medallions, vases, birds and antique figures. It also contains an unusually large chandelier.

== Gallery ==
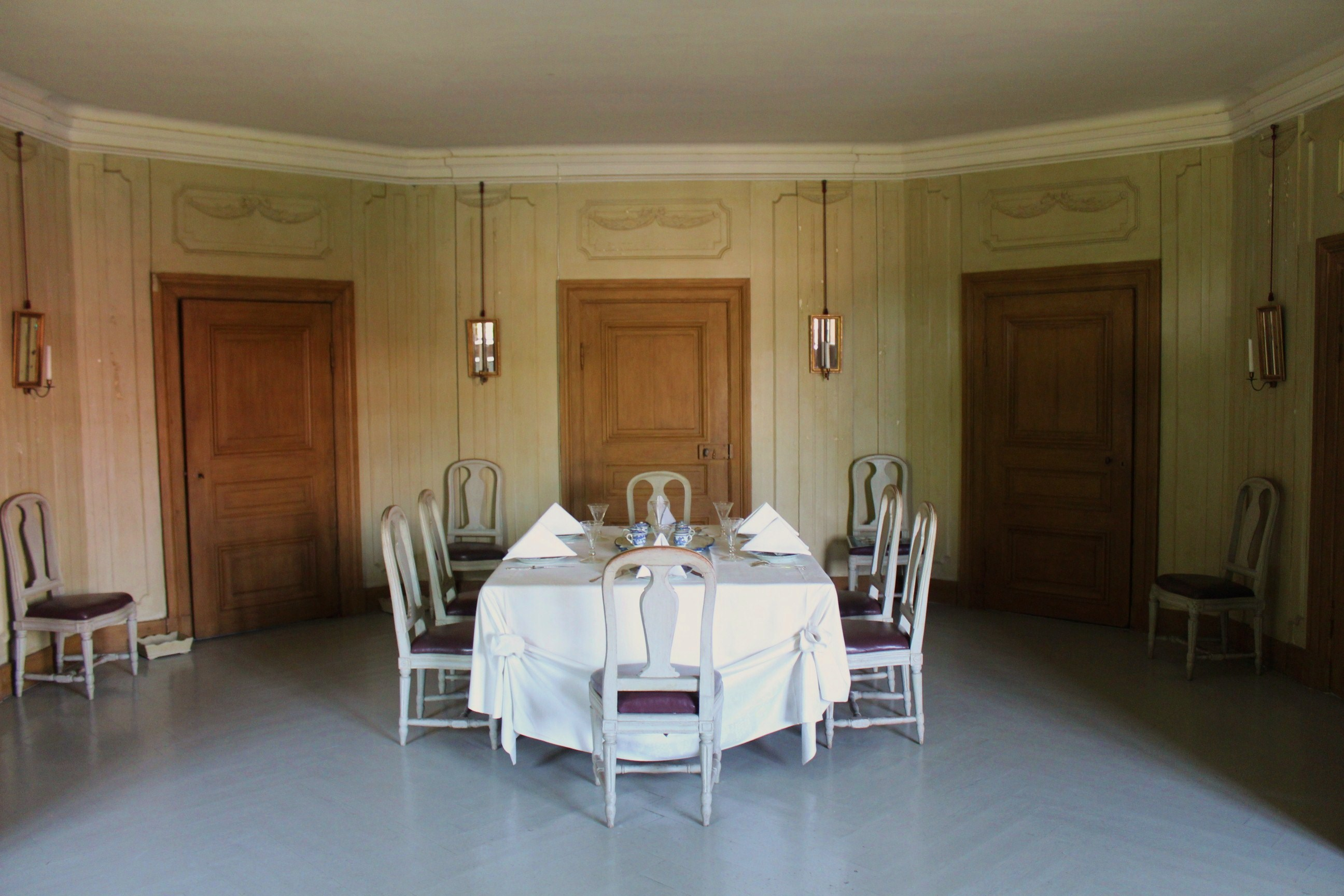
The dining room

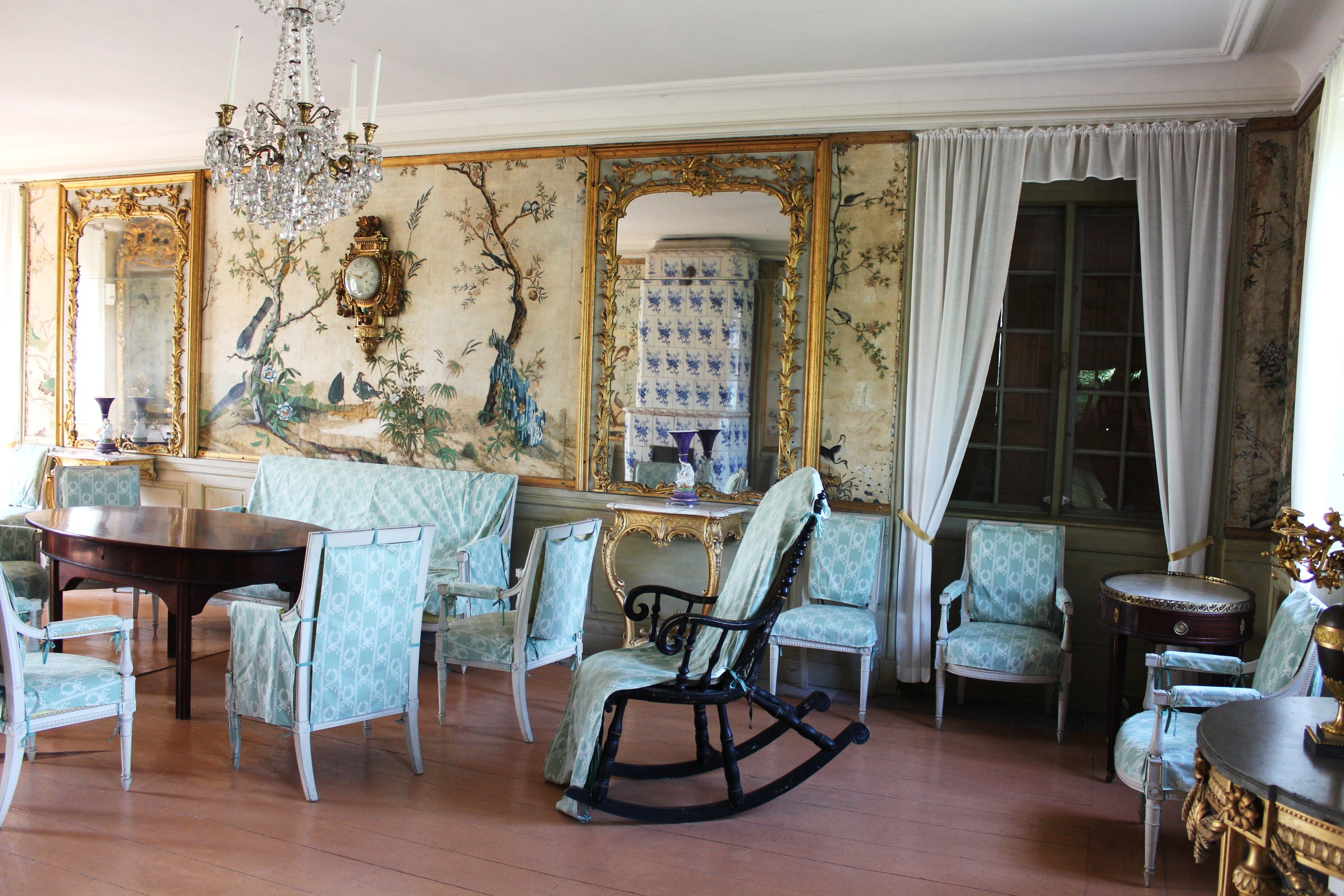
The antechamber

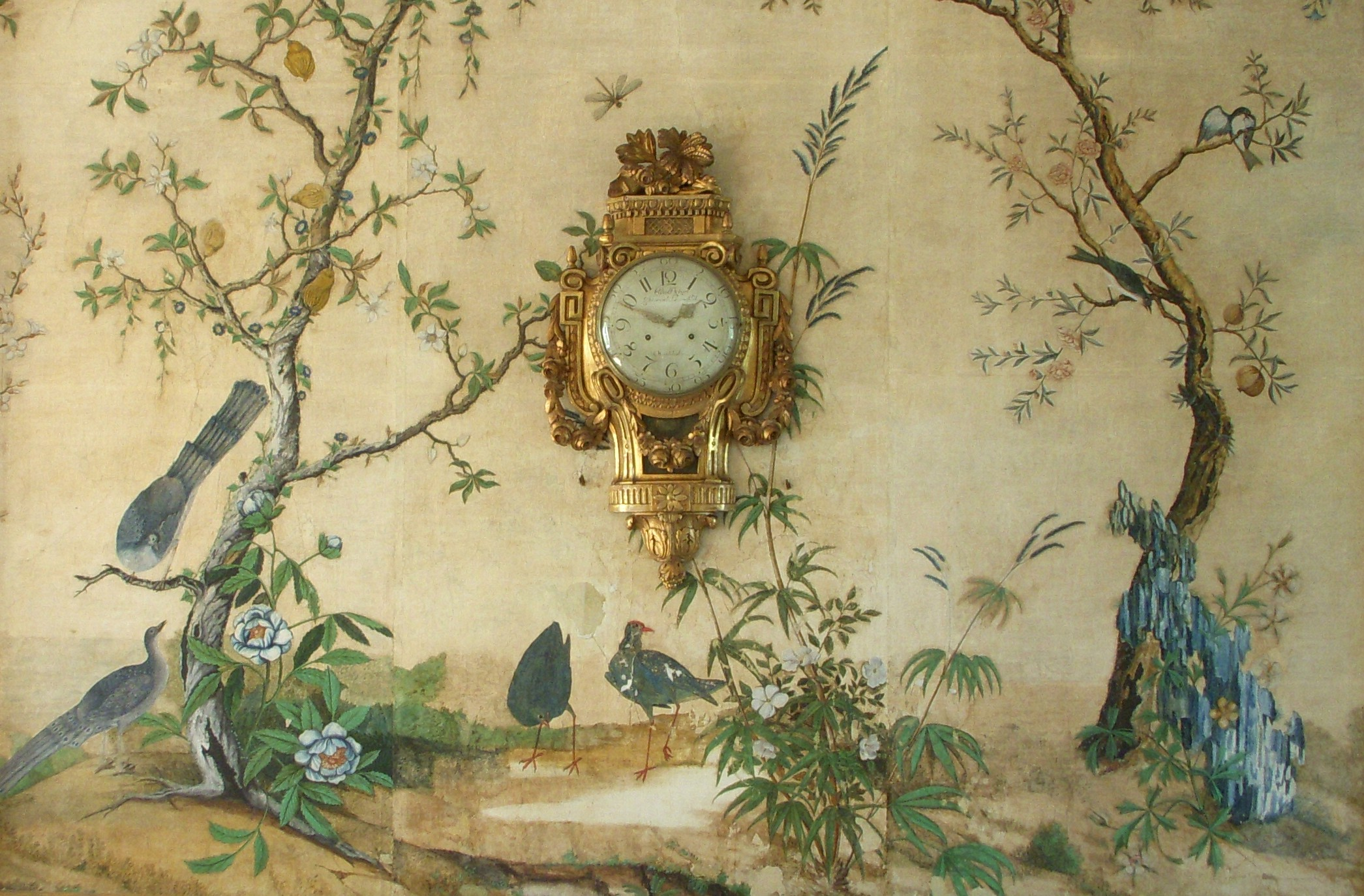
The antechamber, detail with Chinese wallpaper

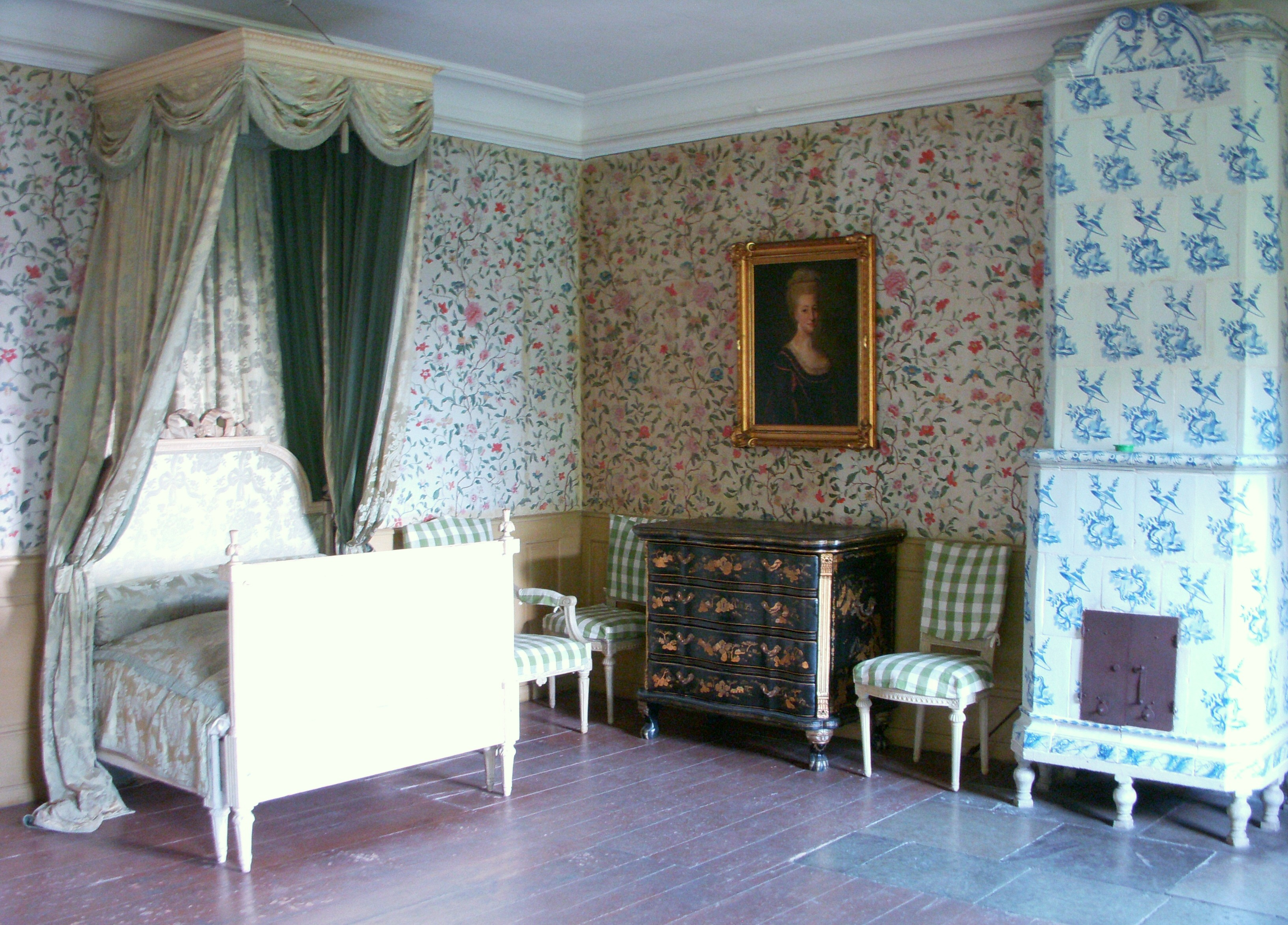
The parade bedchamber

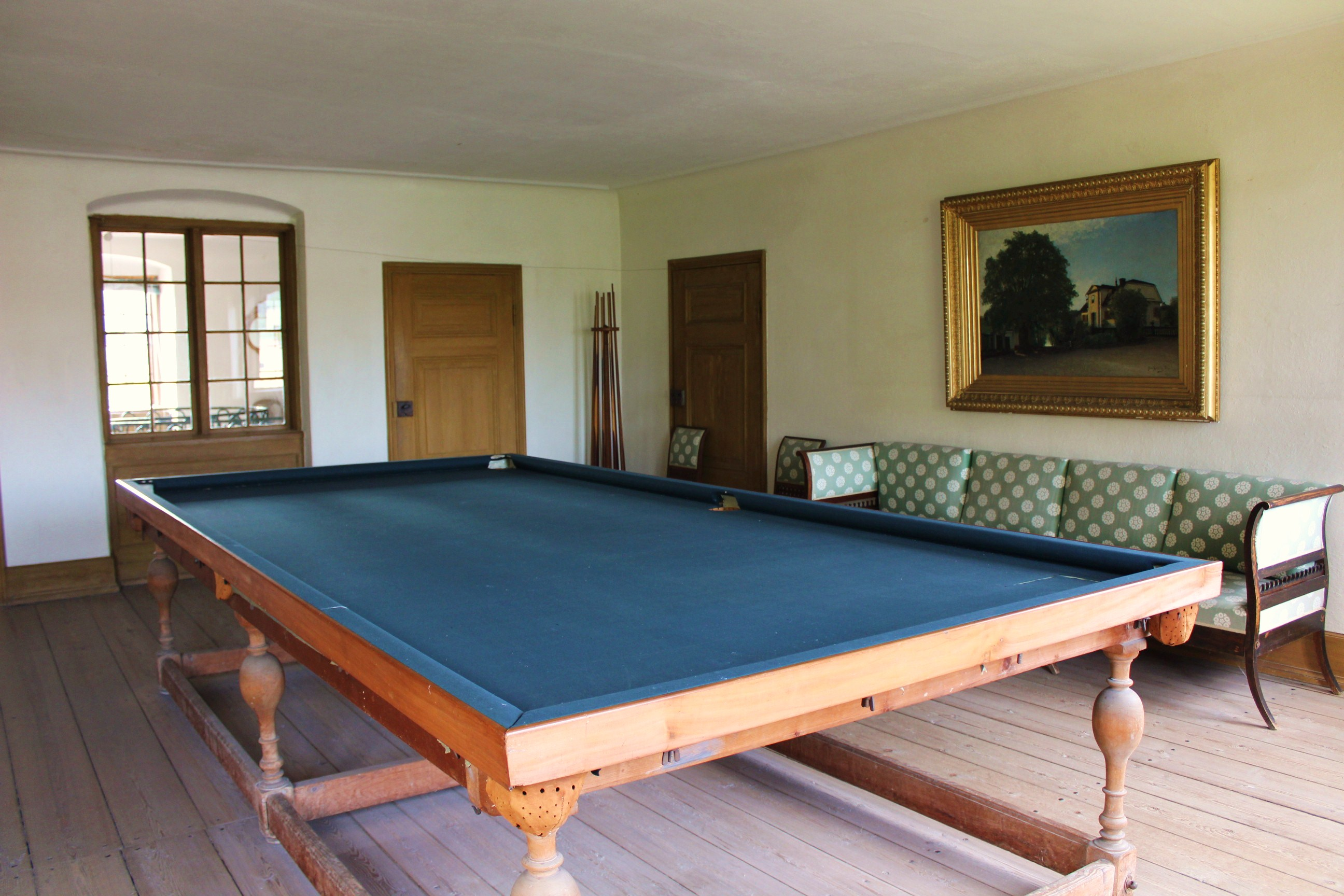
The billiards room

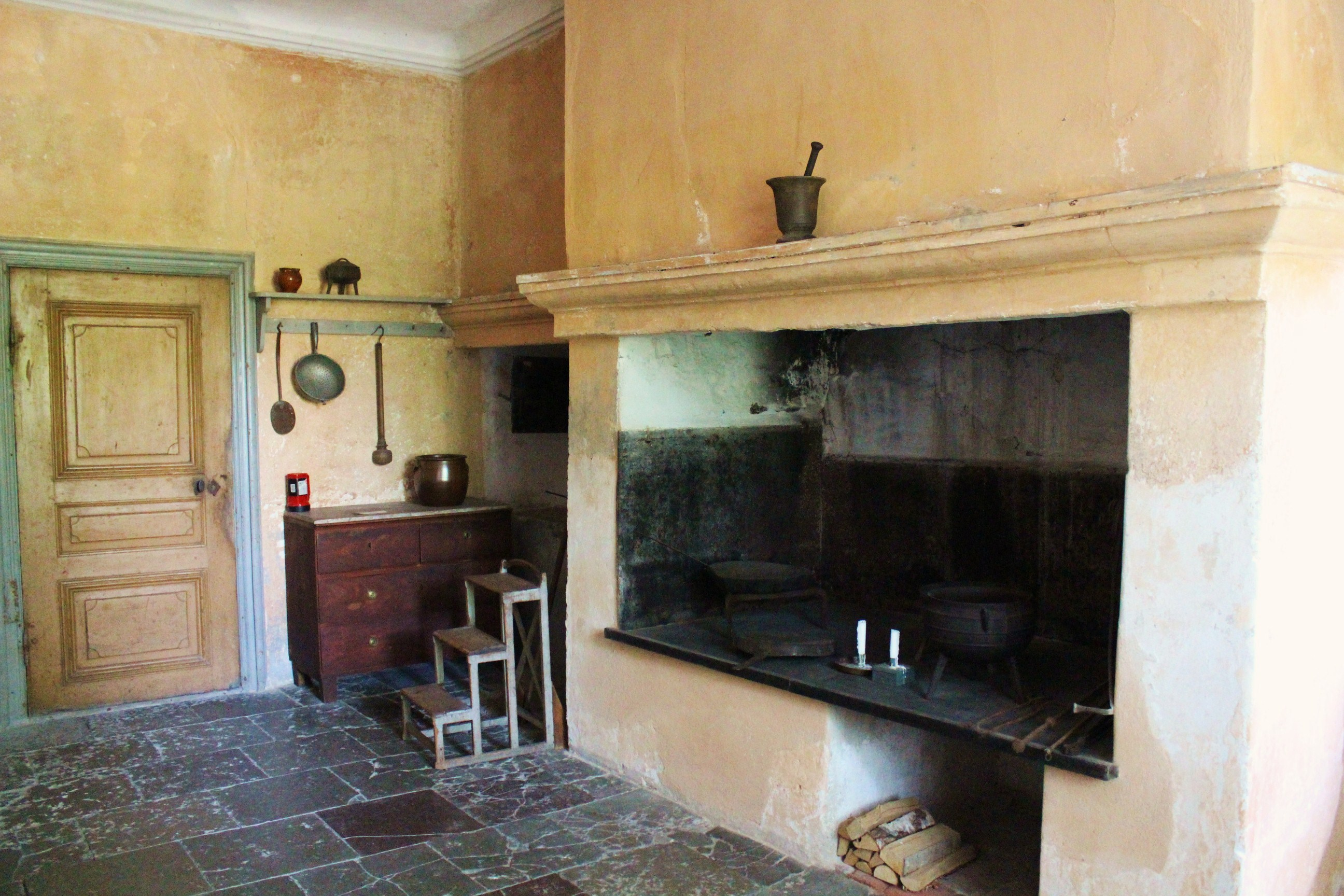
The kitchen

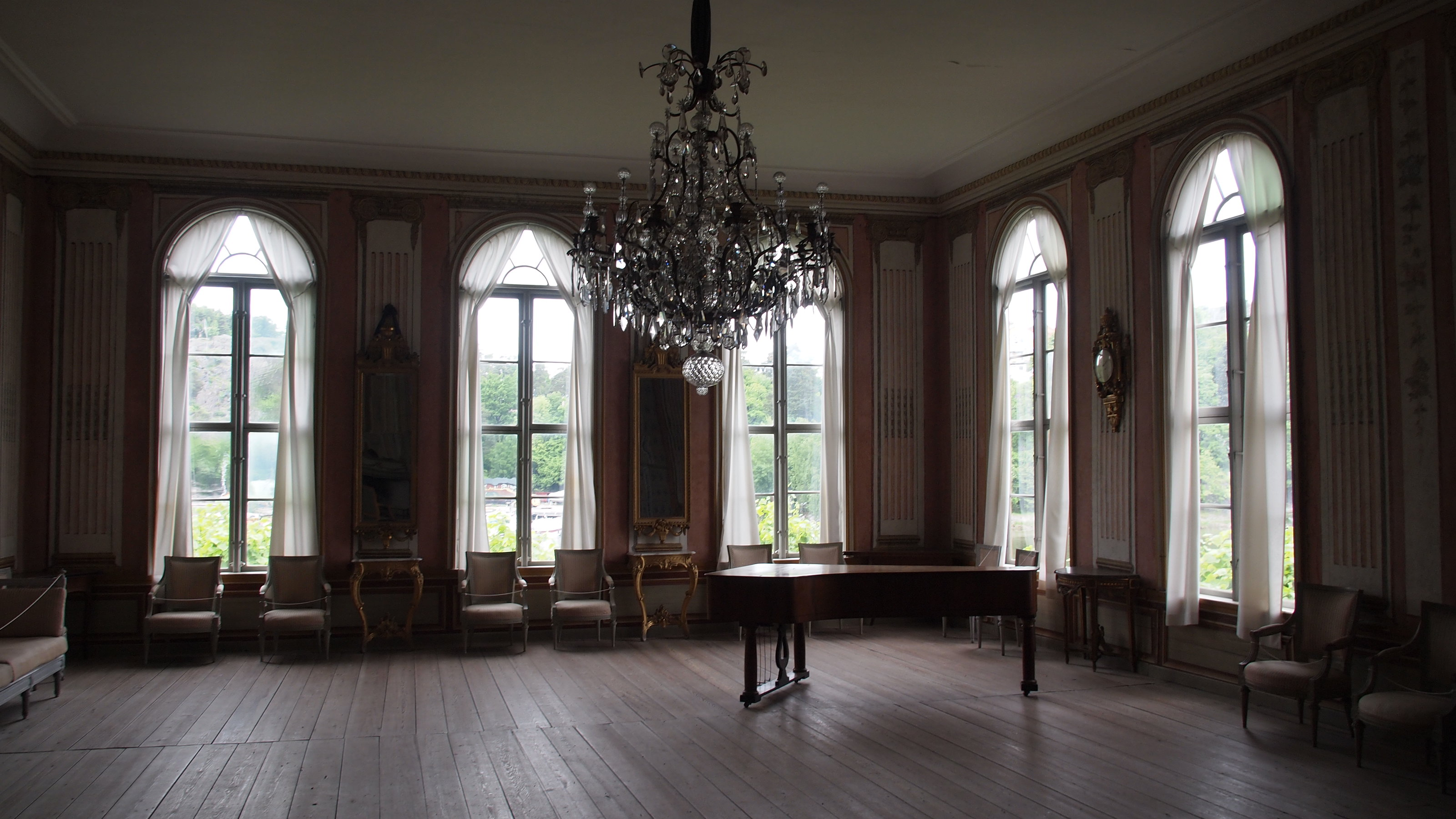
The main room of the pavilion

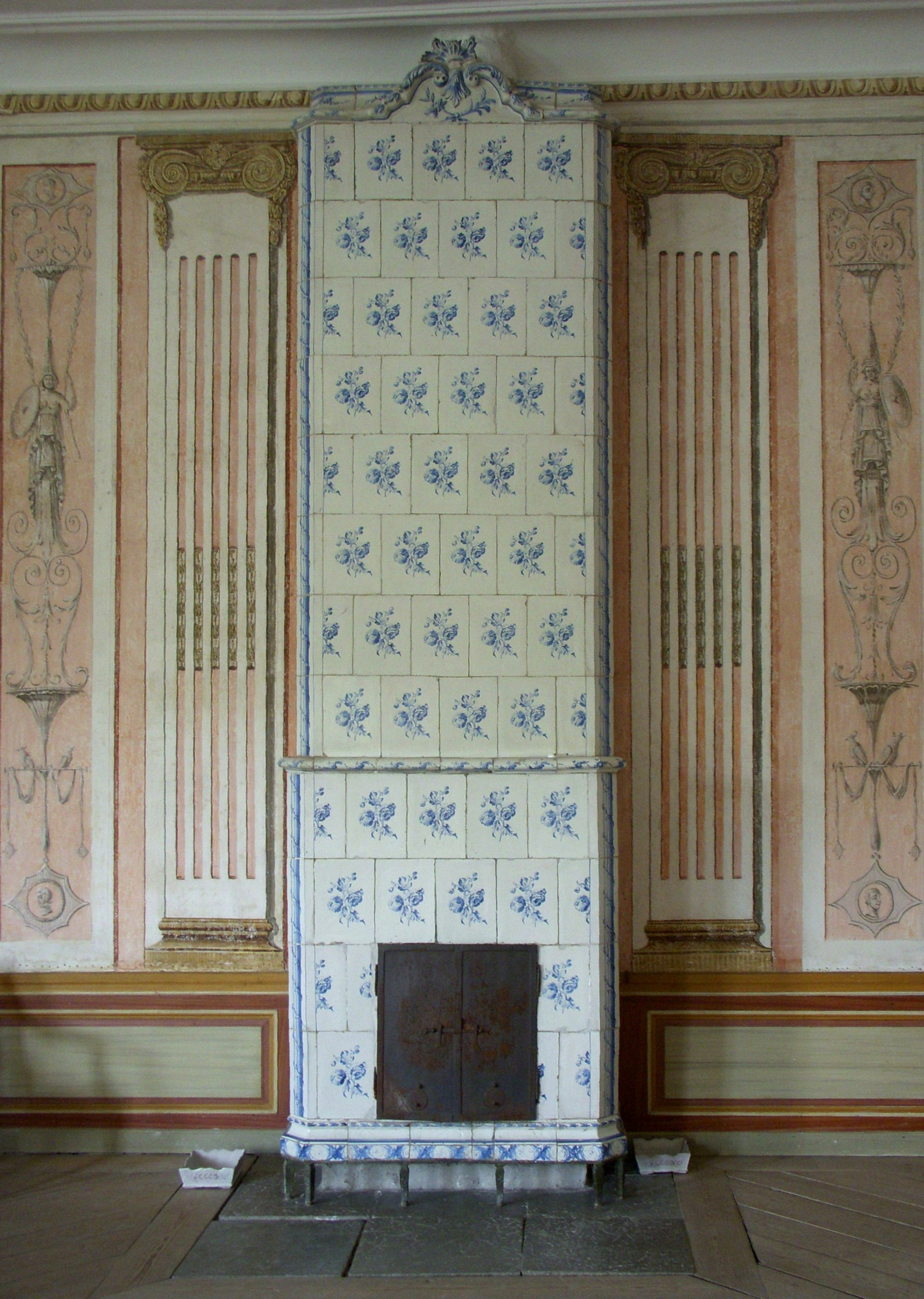
The unusually tall cocklestove in the pavilion
