= Claes Grill =

Swedish merchant (1705–1767)

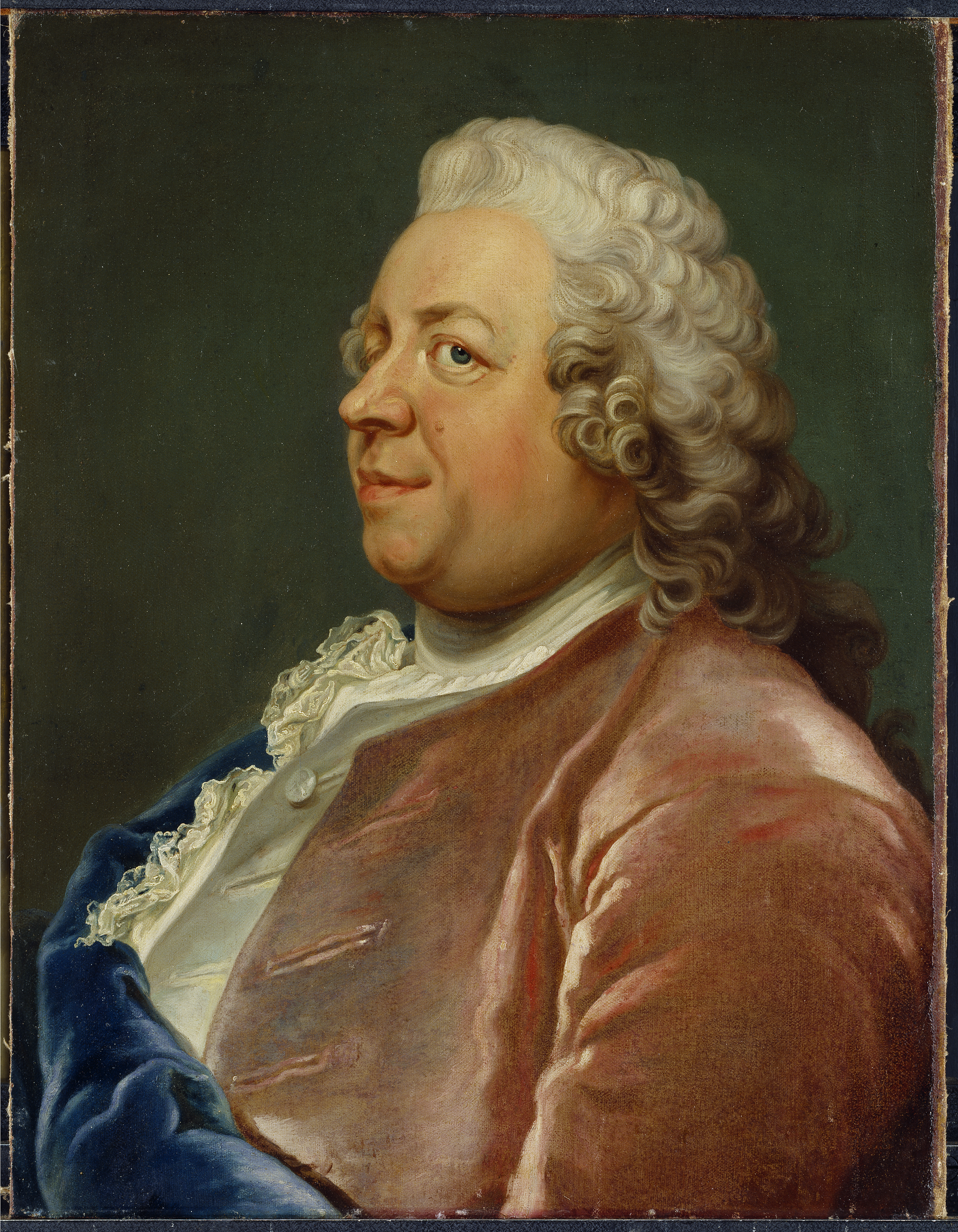
- Claes Grill is always depicted with his left profile. The other side of his face was scarred and he was one-eyed.
- Born: Claes Grill; 19 April 1705; Stockholm, Sweden
- Died: 6 November 1767 (aged 62); Stockholm, Sweden
- Occupations: Merchant, factory owner, ship-owner
- Organization: Swedish East India Company
- Spouse: Anna Johanna Grill
- Children: Adolf Ulric Grill; Anna Johanna
- Relatives: Grill family
- Website: ostindiska.nordiskamuseet.se

Claes Grill (sometimes spelt Claës Grill; 19 April 1705 – 6 November 1767) was a Swedish merchant, factory owner and ship-owner. He was director of the Grill Trading House, one of the leading companies in the East India trade through the Swedish East India Company (SOIC). The trading house also ran a banking business and owned several ironworks in Sweden. Grill also owned several estates, was interested in natural science and had a brief and unsuccessful political career.

== Family ==
One of the notable Grill family, Claes Grill was born in Stockholm, the son of Abraham Grill and Helena Wittmack and twin brother to Anthoni Grill. Grill married his uncle Carlos' daughter, Anna Johanna Grill (1720–1778), (Note: Daughter of Carlos Grill and Hendrica Meijtens, and granddaughter of artist Martin Mijtens the Elder.) a woman famed for her beauty. They had two children, Adolf Ulric, collector and natural scientist, and a daughter named Anna Johanna 1745–1801), who donated The Conspiracy of Claudius Civilis to the Royal Swedish Academy of Fine Arts.

=== Early years ===
Grill started to work for his father and at the age of 17 when he was employed at Abraham's office in the Grill Trading House. After the death of his father, Grill became director of the Trading House, and ran the company together with his uncle Carlos. The name of the company was changed to Carlos & Claes Grill, at that time one of the largest trading company in Sweden. After the death of Carlos (1681–1736), he was sole head of the firm until 1747, when his half-brother joined him as partner. Since the family had connections to the Netherlands, Grill went there in 1731 or 1732, to further his education and gain more experience with the trading business.

== The Grill Trading House ==
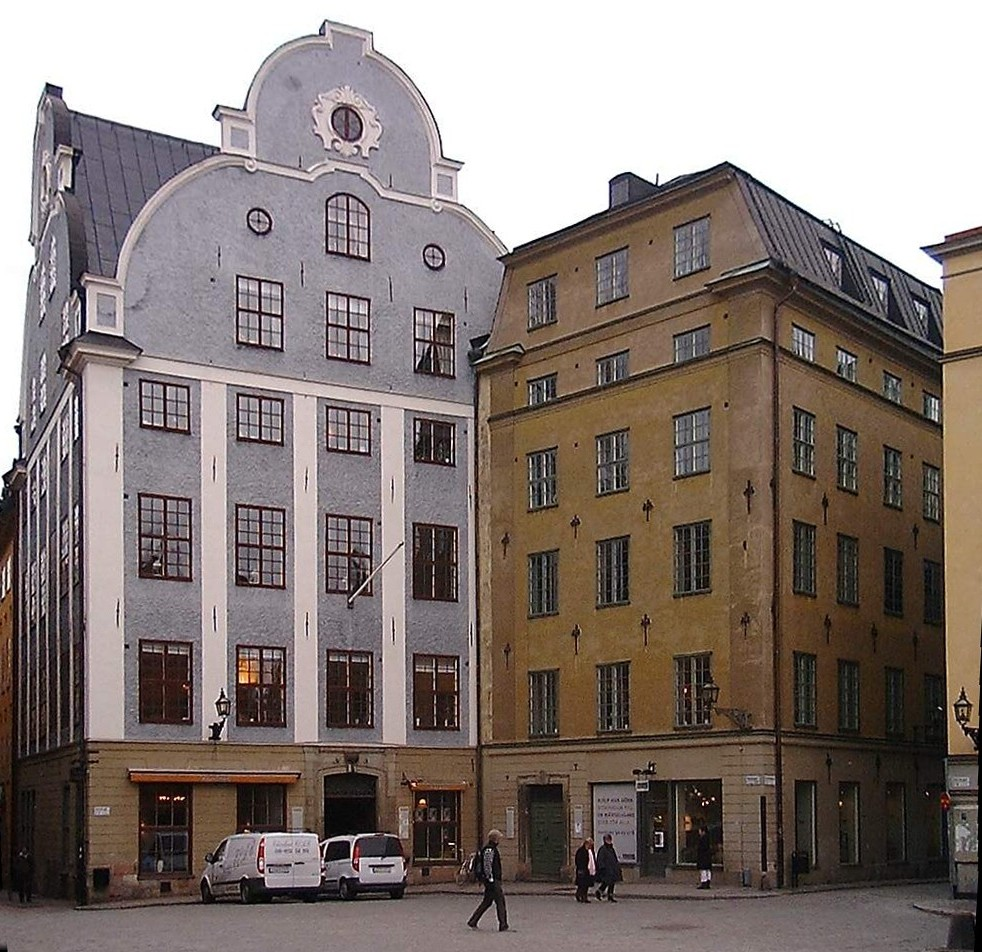
The Grill House at Stortorget, Stockholm

During the mid 18th century, the Grill Trading House flourished both in Sweden and abroad. They were connected to hundreds of trading houses in Europe. Foremost was the export of goods to Hamburg, Amsterdam and England. The Dutch Grill company, Antoni Grill & Sons based in Amsterdam acted as a centre for payments to the Grill trading house in Stockholm. The Anglo-Swedish company run by Andrew & Charles Lindegren in London handled all the exports, shipping documents, vessel clearances, and insurance for the Grill Trading House. They also supplied Swedish ships with transit cargoes from England to the countries around the Mediterranean Sea.

During the second charter of the SOIC between 1746 and 1766, the Grill Trading House was one of the leading companies in the East India trade. They were partners in a large linen and rigging factory as well as a glass factory in Stockholm. They leased the Stora Stads wharf in Stockholm, owned the Terra Nova wharf and had interests in the Djurgården wharf. All three wharfs built ships for both the SOIC and foreign customers.

The Grill Trading House also ran a banking business for Swedes traveling abroad. Since the company was connected to so many other trading houses, they could issue bills of exchange for travelers and diplomats to be redeemed at trading houses in other countries. Under the direction of Grill, the trading house acquired several factories and ironworks: Söderfors 1748, Österbybruk with the Dannemora mine (1750) and Iggesund (1753). The main exports from these factories were iron, copper, lumber and tar. Imports consisted of salt from Portugal, oak and hemp from the Baltic states, also wine, coffee, sugar, cheese, tobacco and textiles. Grill ran his companies in an old-fashioned, patriarchal way writing letters every week to his managers at the estates concerning everything from the running of the factories to making enquiries about individual employees. Overall, the Grills industrial companies employed more than 4,000 persons at that time.

== Houses and estates ==
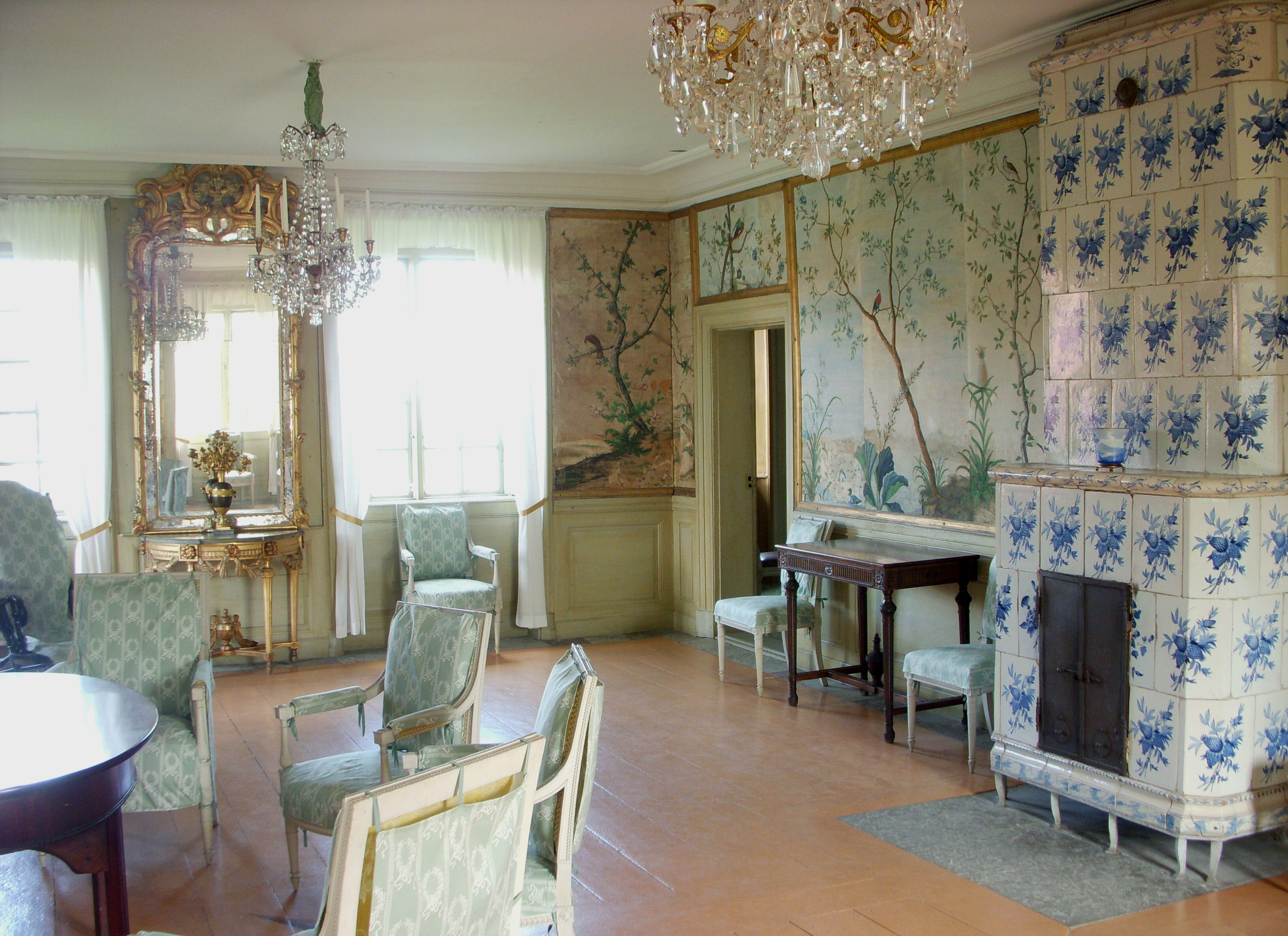
Svindersvik, interior

With the building of the manor in Österbybruk, it became the hub for all the iron and mining activities of the Grill Trading House, although Grill and his family did not live there permanently. They lived in the Grill house in Stockholm until 1764, when he bought the Torstensonska Palace (now known as the Arvfurstens palats) at Gustav Adolfs torg, Stockholm. The summers were spent at Svindersvik, a country residence outside Stockholm, built by Grill in the early 1740s.

Grill was an art collector and his houses were decorated with Chinese objects as well as paintings by Swedish and Dutch masters like Alexander Roslin, Gustaf Lundberg, Hans Memling and David Teniers. He owned six complete sets of porcelain tableware commissioned from Canton (now known as Guangzhou). As of 2014, the oldest and largest of these still has 325 pieces preserved. Imported porcelain broken in transit from China or by daily household use became decorative gravel used on the garden paths at one of the Grills' estates. This example of wasting money and resources was condemned by those who opposed the activities of the SOIC. Even noted botanist Carl Linnaeus was at first an opponent. He wrote: "A part of the silver, which withstands the wear and tear of time and which even fire cannot destroy, we exchange for fragile objects of clay, which, once dropped, cannot be mended."

== Benefactor ==
Grill was interested in natural science and contributed to different projects, such as helping Carl Linnaeus financially and with the collection of plants and animal specimens from foreign lands. In 1740, he became a member of the Royal Swedish Academy of Sciences. He gave financial support to young scientists and naturalists, lent money (without interest) to the Royal Swedish Academy of Sciences for the construction of an observatory, contributed a substantial sum of money to the Danviken Hospital and saved the Sveriges Riksbank (the central bank of Sweden) from bankruptcy in 1747 by buying banknotes at their nominal value. In 1748, he became preses or president of the Royal Academy of Sciences and was elected to the board of directors at the central bank of Sweden, a position he held until 1756. (Note: In his speech at the Academy on 4 February 1749, Grill spoke on the use of shipping. In his speech he summed up the ships owned by shipping companies in Stockholm in 1749: "Ships made of oak: 62 ships up to and including 100 lästs, 16 ships up to 200 lästs, 4 ships up to 300 lästs. Ships made of pine: 63 ships up to and including 100 lästs, 31 ships up to 200 lästs, 13 ships up to 300 lästs and 3 over 300 lästs.") Grill was also awarded the honorary title of kommerseråd ("trade counselor") by King Adolf Frederick. In 1755, he was one of the initiating founders of the Factory Academy, a social network for factory owners in central Sweden.

== Political life and fall ==
Between 1748 and 1750, Grill was a member of the Bourgeoisie in the Riksdag of the Estates and politically involved with the Hats. He was also one of the partners in the infamous Växelkontoret (Exchange office), a private financial institution handling mainly promissory notes without the involvement of the central bank. When the Caps became the ruling party in 1765, Grill, along with his half-brother Johan Abraham and all the other members of the Växelkontoret, were accused of corruption and mishandling its affairs. In 1765, Grill and Johan Abraham, were fined by the Justice deputation of the Riksdag, and in 1766, they were sentenced to pay back "five barrels of gold" to the Växelkontoret. When the Hats regained their political power in the Riksdag the following year, the sentence was revoked, but by then Grill had died.
