= Sanne Houby-Nielsen =

Danish-Swedish archaeologist and museum director

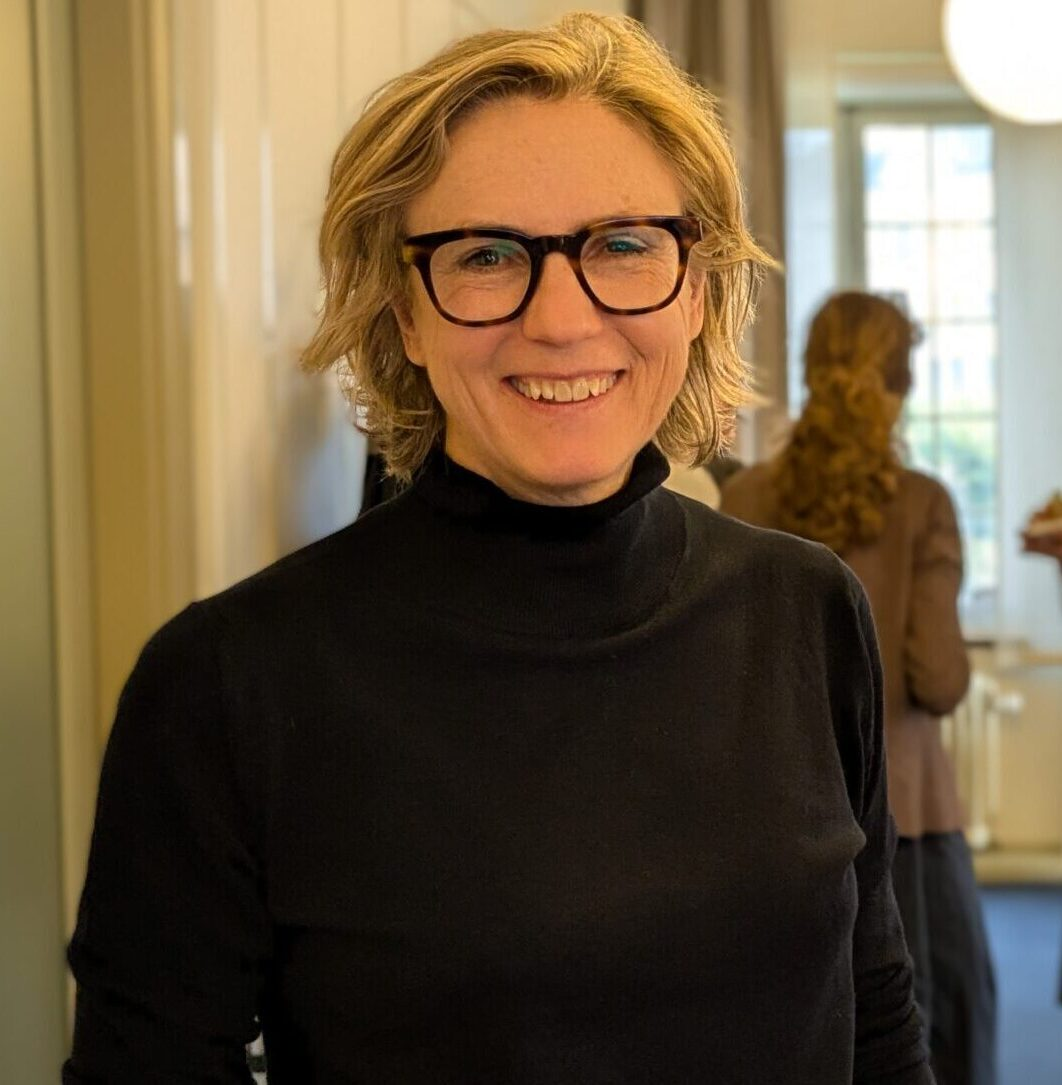
Houby-Nielsen in 2025

Sanne Houby-Nielsen (born 5 May 1960) is a Danish-Swedish archaeologist and museum director. After spending five years as director of the Swedish National Museums of World Culture (Statens museer för världskultur) in Gothenburg, since February 2015 she has headed Sweden's Nordic Museum in Stockholm.

== Early life and education ==
Born in Copenhagen, Houby-Nielsen was brought up partly in the capital and partly on the island of Falster. Interested in history while still young, she studied classical archaeology at the University of Copenhagen as well as in Freiburg and Cambridge. In 1992, she earned a doctorate in classical archaeology from the University of Copenhagen. During the course of her studies, Houby-Nielsen spent extended periods in the Mediterranean countries, especially Greece, Cyprus and Tunisia. In the late 1980s, she met her husband-to-be, the Swedish archaeologist Anders Andrén (born 1952). Around that time, she acquired Swedish nationality.

== Career ==
In 1997, Houby-Nielsen was appointed head of the Royal Cast Collection at the National Gallery of Denmark in Copenhagen. A couple of years later, she moved to Lund, Sweden, where she was a research assistant until 2000, when she became head of the Mediterranean Museum in Stockholm, as well as from 2005 head of the Museum of Far Eastern Antiquities. In 2010, she was appointed director general for all the national Swedish Museums of World Culture with headquarters at the Museum of World Culture in Gothenburg. Since February 2015 she has headed Sweden's Nordic Museum in Stockholm.
